

537001–537100 

|-bgcolor=#E9E9E9
| 537001 ||  || — || March 25, 2015 || Mount Lemmon || Mount Lemmon Survey ||  || align=right | 1.2 km || 
|-id=002 bgcolor=#fefefe
| 537002 ||  || — || November 9, 2013 || Mount Lemmon || Mount Lemmon Survey ||  || align=right data-sort-value="0.67" | 670 m || 
|-id=003 bgcolor=#E9E9E9
| 537003 ||  || — || May 24, 2011 || Mount Lemmon || Mount Lemmon Survey ||  || align=right | 1.1 km || 
|-id=004 bgcolor=#E9E9E9
| 537004 ||  || — || December 6, 2012 || Mount Lemmon || Mount Lemmon Survey ||  || align=right | 2.0 km || 
|-id=005 bgcolor=#d6d6d6
| 537005 ||  || — || October 20, 2007 || Kitt Peak || Spacewatch ||  || align=right | 2.1 km || 
|-id=006 bgcolor=#E9E9E9
| 537006 ||  || — || April 14, 2007 || Mount Lemmon || Mount Lemmon Survey ||  || align=right data-sort-value="0.93" | 930 m || 
|-id=007 bgcolor=#E9E9E9
| 537007 ||  || — || January 22, 2015 || Haleakala || Pan-STARRS ||  || align=right | 2.5 km || 
|-id=008 bgcolor=#E9E9E9
| 537008 ||  || — || March 13, 2011 || Mount Lemmon || Mount Lemmon Survey ||  || align=right data-sort-value="0.70" | 700 m || 
|-id=009 bgcolor=#d6d6d6
| 537009 ||  || — || January 20, 2015 || Haleakala || Pan-STARRS ||  || align=right | 2.5 km || 
|-id=010 bgcolor=#d6d6d6
| 537010 ||  || — || September 16, 2012 || Kitt Peak || Spacewatch ||  || align=right | 2.9 km || 
|-id=011 bgcolor=#E9E9E9
| 537011 ||  || — || March 21, 2015 || Haleakala || Pan-STARRS ||  || align=right data-sort-value="0.75" | 750 m || 
|-id=012 bgcolor=#E9E9E9
| 537012 ||  || — || October 26, 2013 || Mount Lemmon || Mount Lemmon Survey ||  || align=right | 1.1 km || 
|-id=013 bgcolor=#E9E9E9
| 537013 ||  || — || August 26, 2012 || Catalina || CSS ||  || align=right data-sort-value="0.82" | 820 m || 
|-id=014 bgcolor=#E9E9E9
| 537014 ||  || — || November 24, 2009 || Kitt Peak || Spacewatch ||  || align=right data-sort-value="0.93" | 930 m || 
|-id=015 bgcolor=#d6d6d6
| 537015 ||  || — || December 4, 2013 || Haleakala || Pan-STARRS ||  || align=right | 1.8 km || 
|-id=016 bgcolor=#d6d6d6
| 537016 ||  || — || March 21, 2015 || Haleakala || Pan-STARRS ||  || align=right | 2.3 km || 
|-id=017 bgcolor=#E9E9E9
| 537017 ||  || — || March 21, 2015 || Haleakala || Pan-STARRS ||  || align=right data-sort-value="0.76" | 760 m || 
|-id=018 bgcolor=#E9E9E9
| 537018 ||  || — || March 21, 2015 || Haleakala || Pan-STARRS ||  || align=right | 1.2 km || 
|-id=019 bgcolor=#E9E9E9
| 537019 ||  || — || April 30, 2006 || Kitt Peak || Spacewatch ||  || align=right | 1.6 km || 
|-id=020 bgcolor=#fefefe
| 537020 ||  || — || December 26, 2006 || Kitt Peak || Spacewatch ||  || align=right data-sort-value="0.71" | 710 m || 
|-id=021 bgcolor=#E9E9E9
| 537021 ||  || — || March 22, 2015 || Haleakala || Pan-STARRS ||  || align=right | 1.2 km || 
|-id=022 bgcolor=#E9E9E9
| 537022 ||  || — || March 22, 2015 || Haleakala || Pan-STARRS ||  || align=right | 1.6 km || 
|-id=023 bgcolor=#d6d6d6
| 537023 ||  || — || November 19, 2006 || Kitt Peak || Spacewatch || 7:4 || align=right | 3.9 km || 
|-id=024 bgcolor=#E9E9E9
| 537024 ||  || — || February 18, 2010 || Mount Lemmon || Mount Lemmon Survey ||  || align=right | 1.9 km || 
|-id=025 bgcolor=#E9E9E9
| 537025 ||  || — || February 19, 2010 || Mount Lemmon || Mount Lemmon Survey ||  || align=right | 1.8 km || 
|-id=026 bgcolor=#d6d6d6
| 537026 ||  || — || March 22, 2015 || Haleakala || Pan-STARRS ||  || align=right | 2.3 km || 
|-id=027 bgcolor=#E9E9E9
| 537027 ||  || — || March 22, 2015 || Haleakala || Pan-STARRS ||  || align=right data-sort-value="0.88" | 880 m || 
|-id=028 bgcolor=#E9E9E9
| 537028 ||  || — || April 29, 2011 || Mount Lemmon || Mount Lemmon Survey ||  || align=right data-sort-value="0.71" | 710 m || 
|-id=029 bgcolor=#E9E9E9
| 537029 ||  || — || January 28, 2015 || Haleakala || Pan-STARRS ||  || align=right | 1.1 km || 
|-id=030 bgcolor=#d6d6d6
| 537030 ||  || — || November 9, 2007 || Kitt Peak || Spacewatch ||  || align=right | 2.7 km || 
|-id=031 bgcolor=#d6d6d6
| 537031 ||  || — || March 25, 2015 || Haleakala || Pan-STARRS ||  || align=right | 1.8 km || 
|-id=032 bgcolor=#E9E9E9
| 537032 ||  || — || November 9, 2013 || Haleakala || Pan-STARRS ||  || align=right | 1.1 km || 
|-id=033 bgcolor=#E9E9E9
| 537033 ||  || — || April 27, 2011 || Mount Lemmon || Mount Lemmon Survey ||  || align=right data-sort-value="0.98" | 980 m || 
|-id=034 bgcolor=#E9E9E9
| 537034 ||  || — || April 15, 2007 || Kitt Peak || Spacewatch ||  || align=right data-sort-value="0.85" | 850 m || 
|-id=035 bgcolor=#E9E9E9
| 537035 ||  || — || January 23, 2015 || Haleakala || Pan-STARRS ||  || align=right | 2.1 km || 
|-id=036 bgcolor=#fefefe
| 537036 ||  || — || March 15, 2011 || Haleakala || Pan-STARRS ||  || align=right data-sort-value="0.80" | 800 m || 
|-id=037 bgcolor=#d6d6d6
| 537037 ||  || — || March 29, 2015 || Haleakala || Pan-STARRS ||  || align=right | 2.6 km || 
|-id=038 bgcolor=#E9E9E9
| 537038 ||  || — || August 26, 2012 || Haleakala || Pan-STARRS ||  || align=right | 1.5 km || 
|-id=039 bgcolor=#d6d6d6
| 537039 ||  || — || January 25, 2009 || Kitt Peak || Spacewatch ||  || align=right | 2.2 km || 
|-id=040 bgcolor=#E9E9E9
| 537040 ||  || — || October 18, 2012 || Haleakala || Pan-STARRS ||  || align=right | 2.0 km || 
|-id=041 bgcolor=#d6d6d6
| 537041 ||  || — || March 30, 2015 || Haleakala || Pan-STARRS ||  || align=right | 2.2 km || 
|-id=042 bgcolor=#E9E9E9
| 537042 ||  || — || January 28, 2014 || Kitt Peak || Spacewatch ||  || align=right | 2.1 km || 
|-id=043 bgcolor=#E9E9E9
| 537043 ||  || — || January 7, 2006 || Mount Lemmon || Mount Lemmon Survey ||  || align=right data-sort-value="0.87" | 870 m || 
|-id=044 bgcolor=#d6d6d6
| 537044 ||  || — || November 12, 2007 || Mount Lemmon || Mount Lemmon Survey ||  || align=right | 2.4 km || 
|-id=045 bgcolor=#d6d6d6
| 537045 ||  || — || March 25, 2015 || Haleakala || Pan-STARRS ||  || align=right | 2.5 km || 
|-id=046 bgcolor=#E9E9E9
| 537046 ||  || — || January 21, 2015 || Haleakala || Pan-STARRS ||  || align=right | 1.9 km || 
|-id=047 bgcolor=#E9E9E9
| 537047 ||  || — || October 26, 2013 || Mount Lemmon || Mount Lemmon Survey ||  || align=right | 1.3 km || 
|-id=048 bgcolor=#E9E9E9
| 537048 ||  || — || September 17, 2012 || Mount Lemmon || Mount Lemmon Survey ||  || align=right data-sort-value="0.88" | 880 m || 
|-id=049 bgcolor=#E9E9E9
| 537049 ||  || — || April 28, 2011 || Mount Lemmon || Mount Lemmon Survey ||  || align=right data-sort-value="0.71" | 710 m || 
|-id=050 bgcolor=#d6d6d6
| 537050 ||  || — || October 17, 2007 || Mount Lemmon || Mount Lemmon Survey ||  || align=right | 2.9 km || 
|-id=051 bgcolor=#E9E9E9
| 537051 ||  || — || October 18, 2012 || Haleakala || Pan-STARRS ||  || align=right | 1.4 km || 
|-id=052 bgcolor=#E9E9E9
| 537052 ||  || — || March 17, 2015 || Haleakala || Pan-STARRS ||  || align=right | 1.9 km || 
|-id=053 bgcolor=#d6d6d6
| 537053 ||  || — || February 22, 2010 || WISE || WISE ||  || align=right | 3.5 km || 
|-id=054 bgcolor=#E9E9E9
| 537054 ||  || — || April 18, 2010 || WISE || WISE ||  || align=right | 1.9 km || 
|-id=055 bgcolor=#E9E9E9
| 537055 ||  || — || December 18, 2009 || Kitt Peak || Spacewatch ||  || align=right | 1.7 km || 
|-id=056 bgcolor=#d6d6d6
| 537056 ||  || — || January 21, 2015 || Haleakala || Pan-STARRS ||  || align=right | 2.8 km || 
|-id=057 bgcolor=#E9E9E9
| 537057 ||  || — || April 14, 2010 || WISE || WISE ||  || align=right | 3.6 km || 
|-id=058 bgcolor=#FA8072
| 537058 ||  || — || September 3, 2013 || Haleakala || Pan-STARRS || H || align=right data-sort-value="0.43" | 430 m || 
|-id=059 bgcolor=#E9E9E9
| 537059 ||  || — || January 21, 2015 || Haleakala || Pan-STARRS ||  || align=right data-sort-value="0.88" | 880 m || 
|-id=060 bgcolor=#d6d6d6
| 537060 ||  || — || October 6, 2012 || Mount Lemmon || Mount Lemmon Survey ||  || align=right | 3.2 km || 
|-id=061 bgcolor=#d6d6d6
| 537061 ||  || — || January 2, 2014 || Mount Lemmon || Mount Lemmon Survey ||  || align=right | 2.7 km || 
|-id=062 bgcolor=#E9E9E9
| 537062 ||  || — || January 25, 2006 || Kitt Peak || Spacewatch ||  || align=right | 1.1 km || 
|-id=063 bgcolor=#d6d6d6
| 537063 ||  || — || January 17, 2010 || WISE || WISE ||  || align=right | 2.4 km || 
|-id=064 bgcolor=#d6d6d6
| 537064 ||  || — || February 2, 2009 || Mount Lemmon || Mount Lemmon Survey ||  || align=right | 3.5 km || 
|-id=065 bgcolor=#d6d6d6
| 537065 ||  || — || June 16, 2010 || Mount Lemmon || Mount Lemmon Survey ||  || align=right | 3.2 km || 
|-id=066 bgcolor=#E9E9E9
| 537066 ||  || — || February 23, 2015 || Haleakala || Pan-STARRS ||  || align=right data-sort-value="0.84" | 840 m || 
|-id=067 bgcolor=#E9E9E9
| 537067 ||  || — || January 28, 2015 || Haleakala || Pan-STARRS ||  || align=right | 1.7 km || 
|-id=068 bgcolor=#E9E9E9
| 537068 ||  || — || January 28, 2015 || Haleakala || Pan-STARRS ||  || align=right | 1.6 km || 
|-id=069 bgcolor=#E9E9E9
| 537069 ||  || — || January 26, 2006 || Mount Lemmon || Mount Lemmon Survey ||  || align=right | 1.5 km || 
|-id=070 bgcolor=#d6d6d6
| 537070 ||  || — || March 16, 2010 || WISE || WISE ||  || align=right | 2.3 km || 
|-id=071 bgcolor=#E9E9E9
| 537071 ||  || — || November 26, 2014 || Haleakala || Pan-STARRS ||  || align=right data-sort-value="0.99" | 990 m || 
|-id=072 bgcolor=#d6d6d6
| 537072 ||  || — || August 19, 2006 || Kitt Peak || Spacewatch ||  || align=right | 2.9 km || 
|-id=073 bgcolor=#d6d6d6
| 537073 ||  || — || February 22, 2009 || Catalina || CSS ||  || align=right | 4.1 km || 
|-id=074 bgcolor=#E9E9E9
| 537074 ||  || — || November 10, 2013 || Kitt Peak || Spacewatch ||  || align=right | 1.6 km || 
|-id=075 bgcolor=#E9E9E9
| 537075 ||  || — || January 23, 2015 || Haleakala || Pan-STARRS ||  || align=right | 1.4 km || 
|-id=076 bgcolor=#E9E9E9
| 537076 ||  || — || December 3, 2013 || Haleakala || Pan-STARRS ||  || align=right | 1.8 km || 
|-id=077 bgcolor=#E9E9E9
| 537077 ||  || — || October 24, 2008 || Kitt Peak || Spacewatch ||  || align=right | 1.9 km || 
|-id=078 bgcolor=#fefefe
| 537078 ||  || — || August 12, 2012 || Siding Spring || SSS ||  || align=right data-sort-value="0.86" | 860 m || 
|-id=079 bgcolor=#d6d6d6
| 537079 ||  || — || April 14, 2010 || Mount Lemmon || Mount Lemmon Survey ||  || align=right | 2.2 km || 
|-id=080 bgcolor=#d6d6d6
| 537080 ||  || — || May 11, 2010 || Mount Lemmon || Mount Lemmon Survey ||  || align=right | 3.4 km || 
|-id=081 bgcolor=#E9E9E9
| 537081 ||  || — || November 19, 2008 || Mount Lemmon || Mount Lemmon Survey ||  || align=right | 2.0 km || 
|-id=082 bgcolor=#d6d6d6
| 537082 ||  || — || January 29, 2014 || Catalina || CSS ||  || align=right | 2.7 km || 
|-id=083 bgcolor=#E9E9E9
| 537083 ||  || — || February 1, 2006 || Kitt Peak || Spacewatch ||  || align=right | 1.3 km || 
|-id=084 bgcolor=#E9E9E9
| 537084 ||  || — || January 27, 2006 || Mount Lemmon || Mount Lemmon Survey ||  || align=right | 1.1 km || 
|-id=085 bgcolor=#fefefe
| 537085 ||  || — || January 30, 2011 || Haleakala || Pan-STARRS ||  || align=right data-sort-value="0.80" | 800 m || 
|-id=086 bgcolor=#E9E9E9
| 537086 ||  || — || November 19, 2009 || Mount Lemmon || Mount Lemmon Survey ||  || align=right data-sort-value="0.71" | 710 m || 
|-id=087 bgcolor=#d6d6d6
| 537087 ||  || — || March 31, 2009 || Mount Lemmon || Mount Lemmon Survey ||  || align=right | 2.7 km || 
|-id=088 bgcolor=#d6d6d6
| 537088 ||  || — || January 17, 2009 || Kitt Peak || Spacewatch ||  || align=right | 2.5 km || 
|-id=089 bgcolor=#E9E9E9
| 537089 ||  || — || January 6, 2006 || Kitt Peak || Spacewatch ||  || align=right data-sort-value="0.94" | 940 m || 
|-id=090 bgcolor=#d6d6d6
| 537090 ||  || — || February 1, 2009 || Kitt Peak || Spacewatch ||  || align=right | 2.3 km || 
|-id=091 bgcolor=#E9E9E9
| 537091 ||  || — || March 27, 2015 || Haleakala || Pan-STARRS ||  || align=right | 1.9 km || 
|-id=092 bgcolor=#d6d6d6
| 537092 ||  || — || January 25, 2015 || Haleakala || Pan-STARRS ||  || align=right | 3.2 km || 
|-id=093 bgcolor=#E9E9E9
| 537093 ||  || — || October 27, 2008 || Kitt Peak || Spacewatch ||  || align=right | 1.4 km || 
|-id=094 bgcolor=#d6d6d6
| 537094 ||  || — || December 31, 2013 || Mount Lemmon || Mount Lemmon Survey ||  || align=right | 2.4 km || 
|-id=095 bgcolor=#d6d6d6
| 537095 ||  || — || February 4, 2009 || Mount Lemmon || Mount Lemmon Survey ||  || align=right | 3.3 km || 
|-id=096 bgcolor=#E9E9E9
| 537096 ||  || — || October 15, 2012 || Haleakala || Pan-STARRS ||  || align=right | 1.00 km || 
|-id=097 bgcolor=#E9E9E9
| 537097 ||  || — || May 14, 2011 || Mount Lemmon || Mount Lemmon Survey ||  || align=right | 2.0 km || 
|-id=098 bgcolor=#FFC2E0
| 537098 ||  || — || April 13, 2015 || Haleakala || Pan-STARRS || AMO || align=right data-sort-value="0.47" | 470 m || 
|-id=099 bgcolor=#d6d6d6
| 537099 ||  || — || September 11, 2007 || Mount Lemmon || Mount Lemmon Survey ||  || align=right | 3.1 km || 
|-id=100 bgcolor=#E9E9E9
| 537100 ||  || — || January 1, 2014 || Haleakala || Pan-STARRS ||  || align=right | 1.5 km || 
|}

537101–537200 

|-bgcolor=#d6d6d6
| 537101 ||  || — || November 19, 2012 || Kitt Peak || Spacewatch ||  || align=right | 2.7 km || 
|-id=102 bgcolor=#d6d6d6
| 537102 ||  || — || October 15, 2007 || Kitt Peak || Spacewatch ||  || align=right | 2.1 km || 
|-id=103 bgcolor=#d6d6d6
| 537103 ||  || — || June 16, 2010 || WISE || WISE || 7:4 || align=right | 5.7 km || 
|-id=104 bgcolor=#d6d6d6
| 537104 ||  || — || April 14, 2015 || Kitt Peak || Spacewatch ||  || align=right | 2.9 km || 
|-id=105 bgcolor=#E9E9E9
| 537105 ||  || — || January 13, 2010 || WISE || WISE ||  || align=right | 2.5 km || 
|-id=106 bgcolor=#E9E9E9
| 537106 ||  || — || October 1, 2008 || Mount Lemmon || Mount Lemmon Survey ||  || align=right | 1.6 km || 
|-id=107 bgcolor=#E9E9E9
| 537107 ||  || — || January 25, 2015 || Haleakala || Pan-STARRS ||  || align=right data-sort-value="0.87" | 870 m || 
|-id=108 bgcolor=#d6d6d6
| 537108 ||  || — || April 12, 2015 || Haleakala || Pan-STARRS ||  || align=right | 2.6 km || 
|-id=109 bgcolor=#E9E9E9
| 537109 ||  || — || December 29, 2013 || Haleakala || Pan-STARRS ||  || align=right | 1.4 km || 
|-id=110 bgcolor=#E9E9E9
| 537110 ||  || — || June 9, 2007 || Kitt Peak || Spacewatch ||  || align=right data-sort-value="0.83" | 830 m || 
|-id=111 bgcolor=#E9E9E9
| 537111 ||  || — || April 14, 2015 || Kitt Peak || Spacewatch ||  || align=right | 1.3 km || 
|-id=112 bgcolor=#E9E9E9
| 537112 ||  || — || December 11, 2013 || Haleakala || Pan-STARRS ||  || align=right | 1.3 km || 
|-id=113 bgcolor=#d6d6d6
| 537113 ||  || — || July 4, 2005 || Mount Lemmon || Mount Lemmon Survey ||  || align=right | 2.5 km || 
|-id=114 bgcolor=#d6d6d6
| 537114 ||  || — || April 14, 2015 || Kitt Peak || Spacewatch ||  || align=right | 2.5 km || 
|-id=115 bgcolor=#FA8072
| 537115 ||  || — || May 4, 2000 || Kitt Peak || Spacewatch || H || align=right data-sort-value="0.44" | 440 m || 
|-id=116 bgcolor=#E9E9E9
| 537116 ||  || — || January 28, 2015 || Haleakala || Pan-STARRS ||  || align=right | 1.5 km || 
|-id=117 bgcolor=#E9E9E9
| 537117 ||  || — || May 8, 2011 || Mount Lemmon || Mount Lemmon Survey ||  || align=right | 1.4 km || 
|-id=118 bgcolor=#E9E9E9
| 537118 ||  || — || January 20, 2015 || Haleakala || Pan-STARRS ||  || align=right | 1.5 km || 
|-id=119 bgcolor=#E9E9E9
| 537119 ||  || — || January 29, 1998 || Kitt Peak || Spacewatch ||  || align=right data-sort-value="0.72" | 720 m || 
|-id=120 bgcolor=#E9E9E9
| 537120 ||  || — || November 28, 2013 || Mount Lemmon || Mount Lemmon Survey ||  || align=right data-sort-value="0.99" | 990 m || 
|-id=121 bgcolor=#E9E9E9
| 537121 ||  || — || October 16, 2013 || Mount Lemmon || Mount Lemmon Survey ||  || align=right | 1.7 km || 
|-id=122 bgcolor=#d6d6d6
| 537122 ||  || — || October 8, 2007 || Catalina || CSS ||  || align=right | 3.1 km || 
|-id=123 bgcolor=#d6d6d6
| 537123 ||  || — || January 26, 2015 || Haleakala || Pan-STARRS ||  || align=right | 3.4 km || 
|-id=124 bgcolor=#E9E9E9
| 537124 ||  || — || March 31, 2011 || Haleakala || Pan-STARRS ||  || align=right | 1.1 km || 
|-id=125 bgcolor=#fefefe
| 537125 ||  || — || April 8, 2010 || Kitt Peak || Spacewatch || H || align=right data-sort-value="0.44" | 440 m || 
|-id=126 bgcolor=#E9E9E9
| 537126 ||  || — || March 21, 2010 || WISE || WISE ||  || align=right | 1.6 km || 
|-id=127 bgcolor=#E9E9E9
| 537127 ||  || — || October 24, 2005 || Kitt Peak || Spacewatch ||  || align=right data-sort-value="0.88" | 880 m || 
|-id=128 bgcolor=#E9E9E9
| 537128 ||  || — || January 11, 2010 || Kitt Peak || Spacewatch ||  || align=right | 1.8 km || 
|-id=129 bgcolor=#E9E9E9
| 537129 ||  || — || March 16, 2010 || WISE || WISE ||  || align=right | 1.3 km || 
|-id=130 bgcolor=#E9E9E9
| 537130 ||  || — || April 27, 2011 || Kitt Peak || Spacewatch ||  || align=right data-sort-value="0.64" | 640 m || 
|-id=131 bgcolor=#E9E9E9
| 537131 ||  || — || April 26, 2006 || Kitt Peak || Spacewatch ||  || align=right | 1.8 km || 
|-id=132 bgcolor=#d6d6d6
| 537132 ||  || — || December 6, 2007 || Mount Lemmon || Mount Lemmon Survey ||  || align=right | 2.5 km || 
|-id=133 bgcolor=#E9E9E9
| 537133 ||  || — || October 6, 2008 || Kitt Peak || Spacewatch ||  || align=right | 1.7 km || 
|-id=134 bgcolor=#d6d6d6
| 537134 ||  || — || December 13, 2007 || Socorro || LINEAR ||  || align=right | 3.5 km || 
|-id=135 bgcolor=#E9E9E9
| 537135 ||  || — || October 8, 2012 || Haleakala || Pan-STARRS ||  || align=right | 2.5 km || 
|-id=136 bgcolor=#E9E9E9
| 537136 ||  || — || October 3, 2013 || Catalina || CSS ||  || align=right | 1.2 km || 
|-id=137 bgcolor=#d6d6d6
| 537137 ||  || — || June 24, 2010 || WISE || WISE ||  || align=right | 2.0 km || 
|-id=138 bgcolor=#d6d6d6
| 537138 ||  || — || March 27, 2015 || Haleakala || Pan-STARRS ||  || align=right | 2.0 km || 
|-id=139 bgcolor=#E9E9E9
| 537139 ||  || — || April 18, 2015 || Haleakala || Pan-STARRS ||  || align=right data-sort-value="0.94" | 940 m || 
|-id=140 bgcolor=#d6d6d6
| 537140 ||  || — || February 8, 2010 || WISE || WISE ||  || align=right | 2.4 km || 
|-id=141 bgcolor=#E9E9E9
| 537141 ||  || — || June 12, 2010 || WISE || WISE ||  || align=right | 2.4 km || 
|-id=142 bgcolor=#E9E9E9
| 537142 ||  || — || May 11, 2010 || WISE || WISE ||  || align=right | 1.4 km || 
|-id=143 bgcolor=#d6d6d6
| 537143 ||  || — || April 18, 2015 || Haleakala || Pan-STARRS ||  || align=right | 3.4 km || 
|-id=144 bgcolor=#E9E9E9
| 537144 ||  || — || May 21, 2011 || Haleakala || Pan-STARRS ||  || align=right | 1.1 km || 
|-id=145 bgcolor=#d6d6d6
| 537145 ||  || — || October 8, 2007 || Mount Lemmon || Mount Lemmon Survey ||  || align=right | 2.9 km || 
|-id=146 bgcolor=#E9E9E9
| 537146 ||  || — || February 14, 2015 || Mount Lemmon || Mount Lemmon Survey ||  || align=right | 1.2 km || 
|-id=147 bgcolor=#d6d6d6
| 537147 ||  || — || October 15, 2012 || Kitt Peak || Spacewatch ||  || align=right | 2.2 km || 
|-id=148 bgcolor=#d6d6d6
| 537148 ||  || — || May 10, 2004 || Kitt Peak || Spacewatch ||  || align=right | 3.7 km || 
|-id=149 bgcolor=#E9E9E9
| 537149 ||  || — || October 3, 2008 || Kitt Peak || Spacewatch ||  || align=right | 1.6 km || 
|-id=150 bgcolor=#d6d6d6
| 537150 ||  || — || October 18, 2007 || Mount Lemmon || Mount Lemmon Survey ||  || align=right | 1.8 km || 
|-id=151 bgcolor=#E9E9E9
| 537151 ||  || — || March 17, 2015 || Haleakala || Pan-STARRS ||  || align=right | 1.5 km || 
|-id=152 bgcolor=#E9E9E9
| 537152 ||  || — || September 11, 2007 || Kitt Peak || Spacewatch ||  || align=right | 1.7 km || 
|-id=153 bgcolor=#E9E9E9
| 537153 ||  || — || November 28, 2013 || Mount Lemmon || Mount Lemmon Survey ||  || align=right | 1.3 km || 
|-id=154 bgcolor=#E9E9E9
| 537154 ||  || — || October 16, 2003 || Kitt Peak || Spacewatch ||  || align=right | 1.6 km || 
|-id=155 bgcolor=#E9E9E9
| 537155 ||  || — || September 10, 2007 || Catalina || CSS ||  || align=right | 1.6 km || 
|-id=156 bgcolor=#E9E9E9
| 537156 ||  || — || September 16, 2003 || Kitt Peak || Spacewatch ||  || align=right | 1.3 km || 
|-id=157 bgcolor=#E9E9E9
| 537157 ||  || — || October 27, 2008 || Mount Lemmon || Mount Lemmon Survey ||  || align=right | 1.2 km || 
|-id=158 bgcolor=#E9E9E9
| 537158 ||  || — || March 14, 2010 || Mount Lemmon || Mount Lemmon Survey ||  || align=right | 1.7 km || 
|-id=159 bgcolor=#d6d6d6
| 537159 ||  || — || February 14, 2010 || WISE || WISE ||  || align=right | 2.2 km || 
|-id=160 bgcolor=#E9E9E9
| 537160 ||  || — || January 1, 2009 || Kitt Peak || Spacewatch ||  || align=right | 2.0 km || 
|-id=161 bgcolor=#E9E9E9
| 537161 ||  || — || October 8, 2012 || Kitt Peak || Spacewatch ||  || align=right | 1.2 km || 
|-id=162 bgcolor=#E9E9E9
| 537162 ||  || — || November 9, 2008 || Kitt Peak || Spacewatch ||  || align=right | 1.5 km || 
|-id=163 bgcolor=#E9E9E9
| 537163 ||  || — || February 15, 2010 || Kitt Peak || Spacewatch ||  || align=right | 1.6 km || 
|-id=164 bgcolor=#d6d6d6
| 537164 ||  || — || October 8, 2012 || Haleakala || Pan-STARRS ||  || align=right | 2.9 km || 
|-id=165 bgcolor=#E9E9E9
| 537165 ||  || — || May 3, 2011 || Mount Lemmon || Mount Lemmon Survey ||  || align=right | 1.2 km || 
|-id=166 bgcolor=#E9E9E9
| 537166 ||  || — || January 8, 2010 || Kitt Peak || Spacewatch ||  || align=right | 1.3 km || 
|-id=167 bgcolor=#E9E9E9
| 537167 ||  || — || October 8, 2012 || Mount Lemmon || Mount Lemmon Survey ||  || align=right | 2.0 km || 
|-id=168 bgcolor=#fefefe
| 537168 ||  || — || September 27, 2006 || Mount Lemmon || Mount Lemmon Survey ||  || align=right data-sort-value="0.72" | 720 m || 
|-id=169 bgcolor=#E9E9E9
| 537169 ||  || — || October 20, 2008 || Mount Lemmon || Mount Lemmon Survey ||  || align=right | 1.3 km || 
|-id=170 bgcolor=#E9E9E9
| 537170 ||  || — || March 12, 2010 || WISE || WISE ||  || align=right | 2.9 km || 
|-id=171 bgcolor=#E9E9E9
| 537171 ||  || — || May 27, 2011 || Kitt Peak || Spacewatch ||  || align=right | 1.2 km || 
|-id=172 bgcolor=#FA8072
| 537172 ||  || — || November 12, 2005 || Kitt Peak || Spacewatch || H || align=right data-sort-value="0.53" | 530 m || 
|-id=173 bgcolor=#d6d6d6
| 537173 ||  || — || October 11, 2012 || Mount Lemmon || Mount Lemmon Survey ||  || align=right | 1.9 km || 
|-id=174 bgcolor=#d6d6d6
| 537174 ||  || — || January 15, 2010 || WISE || WISE ||  || align=right | 2.7 km || 
|-id=175 bgcolor=#E9E9E9
| 537175 ||  || — || October 15, 2004 || Mount Lemmon || Mount Lemmon Survey ||  || align=right | 1.8 km || 
|-id=176 bgcolor=#E9E9E9
| 537176 ||  || — || April 23, 2015 || Haleakala || Pan-STARRS ||  || align=right data-sort-value="0.72" | 720 m || 
|-id=177 bgcolor=#E9E9E9
| 537177 ||  || — || October 6, 2012 || Haleakala || Pan-STARRS ||  || align=right | 1.3 km || 
|-id=178 bgcolor=#E9E9E9
| 537178 ||  || — || October 11, 2012 || Haleakala || Pan-STARRS ||  || align=right | 1.4 km || 
|-id=179 bgcolor=#fefefe
| 537179 ||  || — || January 19, 2004 || Kitt Peak || Spacewatch ||  || align=right data-sort-value="0.77" | 770 m || 
|-id=180 bgcolor=#E9E9E9
| 537180 ||  || — || March 2, 2010 || WISE || WISE ||  || align=right data-sort-value="0.88" | 880 m || 
|-id=181 bgcolor=#E9E9E9
| 537181 ||  || — || April 16, 2010 || WISE || WISE || ADE || align=right | 3.0 km || 
|-id=182 bgcolor=#E9E9E9
| 537182 ||  || — || March 27, 2010 || WISE || WISE ||  || align=right | 2.0 km || 
|-id=183 bgcolor=#E9E9E9
| 537183 ||  || — || January 31, 2015 || Haleakala || Pan-STARRS ||  || align=right | 2.3 km || 
|-id=184 bgcolor=#E9E9E9
| 537184 ||  || — || January 22, 2015 || Haleakala || Pan-STARRS ||  || align=right | 1.4 km || 
|-id=185 bgcolor=#E9E9E9
| 537185 ||  || — || December 3, 2014 || Haleakala || Pan-STARRS ||  || align=right | 1.6 km || 
|-id=186 bgcolor=#E9E9E9
| 537186 ||  || — || March 13, 2010 || Catalina || CSS ||  || align=right | 2.9 km || 
|-id=187 bgcolor=#fefefe
| 537187 ||  || — || March 31, 2011 || Haleakala || Pan-STARRS ||  || align=right data-sort-value="0.98" | 980 m || 
|-id=188 bgcolor=#d6d6d6
| 537188 ||  || — || April 1, 2015 || Haleakala || Pan-STARRS ||  || align=right | 2.4 km || 
|-id=189 bgcolor=#E9E9E9
| 537189 ||  || — || April 16, 2007 || Mount Lemmon || Mount Lemmon Survey ||  || align=right data-sort-value="0.64" | 640 m || 
|-id=190 bgcolor=#d6d6d6
| 537190 ||  || — || September 14, 2007 || Mount Lemmon || Mount Lemmon Survey ||  || align=right | 2.0 km || 
|-id=191 bgcolor=#E9E9E9
| 537191 ||  || — || January 23, 2014 || Catalina || CSS ||  || align=right | 2.9 km || 
|-id=192 bgcolor=#d6d6d6
| 537192 ||  || — || January 28, 2014 || Mount Lemmon || Mount Lemmon Survey ||  || align=right | 2.5 km || 
|-id=193 bgcolor=#d6d6d6
| 537193 ||  || — || August 17, 2009 || La Sagra || OAM Obs. || 3:2 || align=right | 4.8 km || 
|-id=194 bgcolor=#E9E9E9
| 537194 ||  || — || March 12, 2010 || Kitt Peak || Spacewatch ||  || align=right | 1.8 km || 
|-id=195 bgcolor=#E9E9E9
| 537195 ||  || — || April 21, 2006 || Catalina || CSS ||  || align=right | 2.4 km || 
|-id=196 bgcolor=#E9E9E9
| 537196 ||  || — || September 11, 2007 || Mount Lemmon || Mount Lemmon Survey ||  || align=right | 1.9 km || 
|-id=197 bgcolor=#E9E9E9
| 537197 ||  || — || February 28, 2010 || WISE || WISE ||  || align=right | 2.1 km || 
|-id=198 bgcolor=#E9E9E9
| 537198 ||  || — || May 5, 2011 || Mount Lemmon || Mount Lemmon Survey ||  || align=right data-sort-value="0.80" | 800 m || 
|-id=199 bgcolor=#E9E9E9
| 537199 ||  || — || March 12, 2010 || WISE || WISE || ADE || align=right | 2.7 km || 
|-id=200 bgcolor=#E9E9E9
| 537200 ||  || — || November 28, 2014 || Mount Lemmon || Mount Lemmon Survey || (194) || align=right | 1.3 km || 
|}

537201–537300 

|-bgcolor=#E9E9E9
| 537201 ||  || — || January 23, 2015 || Haleakala || Pan-STARRS ||  || align=right data-sort-value="0.91" | 910 m || 
|-id=202 bgcolor=#E9E9E9
| 537202 ||  || — || March 15, 2010 || Mount Lemmon || Mount Lemmon Survey ||  || align=right | 2.6 km || 
|-id=203 bgcolor=#E9E9E9
| 537203 ||  || — || January 28, 2015 || Haleakala || Pan-STARRS ||  || align=right | 1.9 km || 
|-id=204 bgcolor=#d6d6d6
| 537204 ||  || — || November 17, 2007 || Kitt Peak || Spacewatch ||  || align=right | 2.8 km || 
|-id=205 bgcolor=#E9E9E9
| 537205 ||  || — || January 28, 2015 || Haleakala || Pan-STARRS ||  || align=right | 1.6 km || 
|-id=206 bgcolor=#E9E9E9
| 537206 ||  || — || November 8, 2013 || Mount Lemmon || Mount Lemmon Survey ||  || align=right data-sort-value="0.87" | 870 m || 
|-id=207 bgcolor=#E9E9E9
| 537207 ||  || — || March 19, 2010 || Mount Lemmon || Mount Lemmon Survey ||  || align=right | 2.7 km || 
|-id=208 bgcolor=#E9E9E9
| 537208 ||  || — || January 25, 2006 || Kitt Peak || Spacewatch ||  || align=right | 1.2 km || 
|-id=209 bgcolor=#E9E9E9
| 537209 ||  || — || October 11, 2004 || Kitt Peak || Spacewatch ||  || align=right | 1.5 km || 
|-id=210 bgcolor=#E9E9E9
| 537210 ||  || — || December 19, 2004 || Mount Lemmon || Mount Lemmon Survey ||  || align=right | 2.0 km || 
|-id=211 bgcolor=#E9E9E9
| 537211 ||  || — || January 7, 2006 || Mount Lemmon || Mount Lemmon Survey ||  || align=right data-sort-value="0.82" | 820 m || 
|-id=212 bgcolor=#E9E9E9
| 537212 ||  || — || April 23, 2015 || Haleakala || Pan-STARRS ||  || align=right data-sort-value="0.81" | 810 m || 
|-id=213 bgcolor=#E9E9E9
| 537213 ||  || — || April 23, 2015 || Haleakala || Pan-STARRS ||  || align=right | 1.1 km || 
|-id=214 bgcolor=#E9E9E9
| 537214 ||  || — || April 25, 2015 || Haleakala || Pan-STARRS ||  || align=right | 1.3 km || 
|-id=215 bgcolor=#d6d6d6
| 537215 ||  || — || December 22, 2012 || Haleakala || Pan-STARRS ||  || align=right | 2.8 km || 
|-id=216 bgcolor=#d6d6d6
| 537216 ||  || — || November 15, 2012 || Mount Lemmon || Mount Lemmon Survey ||  || align=right | 2.5 km || 
|-id=217 bgcolor=#d6d6d6
| 537217 ||  || — || March 11, 2014 || Mount Lemmon || Mount Lemmon Survey ||  || align=right | 2.6 km || 
|-id=218 bgcolor=#d6d6d6
| 537218 ||  || — || April 8, 2010 || WISE || WISE ||  || align=right | 2.8 km || 
|-id=219 bgcolor=#E9E9E9
| 537219 ||  || — || September 10, 2007 || Kitt Peak || Spacewatch ||  || align=right | 2.1 km || 
|-id=220 bgcolor=#d6d6d6
| 537220 ||  || — || September 4, 2011 || Haleakala || Pan-STARRS ||  || align=right | 2.7 km || 
|-id=221 bgcolor=#E9E9E9
| 537221 ||  || — || April 18, 2015 || Mount Lemmon || Mount Lemmon Survey ||  || align=right data-sort-value="0.71" | 710 m || 
|-id=222 bgcolor=#E9E9E9
| 537222 ||  || — || October 11, 2012 || Haleakala || Pan-STARRS ||  || align=right | 1.8 km || 
|-id=223 bgcolor=#d6d6d6
| 537223 ||  || — || October 16, 2012 || Mount Lemmon || Mount Lemmon Survey ||  || align=right | 2.2 km || 
|-id=224 bgcolor=#d6d6d6
| 537224 ||  || — || December 4, 2007 || Mount Lemmon || Mount Lemmon Survey ||  || align=right | 2.5 km || 
|-id=225 bgcolor=#E9E9E9
| 537225 ||  || — || April 25, 2015 || Haleakala || Pan-STARRS ||  || align=right data-sort-value="0.71" | 710 m || 
|-id=226 bgcolor=#d6d6d6
| 537226 ||  || — || January 11, 2008 || Mount Lemmon || Mount Lemmon Survey ||  || align=right | 2.9 km || 
|-id=227 bgcolor=#d6d6d6
| 537227 ||  || — || May 3, 2010 || WISE || WISE ||  || align=right | 3.8 km || 
|-id=228 bgcolor=#d6d6d6
| 537228 ||  || — || February 24, 2014 || Haleakala || Pan-STARRS ||  || align=right | 3.7 km || 
|-id=229 bgcolor=#E9E9E9
| 537229 ||  || — || April 9, 2010 || WISE || WISE ||  || align=right data-sort-value="0.89" | 890 m || 
|-id=230 bgcolor=#d6d6d6
| 537230 ||  || — || April 18, 2015 || Haleakala || Pan-STARRS ||  || align=right | 2.0 km || 
|-id=231 bgcolor=#E9E9E9
| 537231 ||  || — || January 2, 2009 || Mount Lemmon || Mount Lemmon Survey ||  || align=right | 2.1 km || 
|-id=232 bgcolor=#d6d6d6
| 537232 ||  || — || December 9, 2012 || Haleakala || Pan-STARRS ||  || align=right | 2.4 km || 
|-id=233 bgcolor=#d6d6d6
| 537233 ||  || — || November 29, 2013 || Mount Lemmon || Mount Lemmon Survey ||  || align=right | 3.3 km || 
|-id=234 bgcolor=#E9E9E9
| 537234 ||  || — || March 20, 2001 || Kitt Peak || Spacewatch ||  || align=right | 2.1 km || 
|-id=235 bgcolor=#E9E9E9
| 537235 ||  || — || December 30, 2013 || Kitt Peak || Spacewatch ||  || align=right | 2.1 km || 
|-id=236 bgcolor=#E9E9E9
| 537236 ||  || — || April 25, 2015 || Haleakala || Pan-STARRS ||  || align=right | 1.2 km || 
|-id=237 bgcolor=#E9E9E9
| 537237 ||  || — || March 15, 2010 || Kitt Peak || Spacewatch ||  || align=right | 1.7 km || 
|-id=238 bgcolor=#E9E9E9
| 537238 ||  || — || September 19, 2012 || Mount Lemmon || Mount Lemmon Survey ||  || align=right | 1.4 km || 
|-id=239 bgcolor=#E9E9E9
| 537239 ||  || — || August 4, 2003 || Kitt Peak || Spacewatch ||  || align=right data-sort-value="0.65" | 650 m || 
|-id=240 bgcolor=#E9E9E9
| 537240 ||  || — || April 29, 2011 || Mount Lemmon || Mount Lemmon Survey ||  || align=right data-sort-value="0.86" | 860 m || 
|-id=241 bgcolor=#E9E9E9
| 537241 ||  || — || April 18, 2015 || Haleakala || Pan-STARRS ||  || align=right | 1.8 km || 
|-id=242 bgcolor=#E9E9E9
| 537242 ||  || — || April 18, 2015 || Haleakala || Pan-STARRS ||  || align=right data-sort-value="0.77" | 770 m || 
|-id=243 bgcolor=#E9E9E9
| 537243 ||  || — || October 17, 2012 || Mount Lemmon || Mount Lemmon Survey ||  || align=right | 1.3 km || 
|-id=244 bgcolor=#E9E9E9
| 537244 ||  || — || March 22, 2015 || Haleakala || Pan-STARRS ||  || align=right | 1.1 km || 
|-id=245 bgcolor=#E9E9E9
| 537245 ||  || — || December 11, 2013 || Haleakala || Pan-STARRS ||  || align=right | 1.2 km || 
|-id=246 bgcolor=#E9E9E9
| 537246 ||  || — || April 24, 2006 || Kitt Peak || Spacewatch ||  || align=right | 2.1 km || 
|-id=247 bgcolor=#E9E9E9
| 537247 ||  || — || January 28, 2015 || Haleakala || Pan-STARRS ||  || align=right | 2.3 km || 
|-id=248 bgcolor=#E9E9E9
| 537248 ||  || — || January 28, 2015 || Haleakala || Pan-STARRS ||  || align=right data-sort-value="0.97" | 970 m || 
|-id=249 bgcolor=#E9E9E9
| 537249 ||  || — || March 22, 2015 || Mount Lemmon || Mount Lemmon Survey ||  || align=right data-sort-value="0.90" | 900 m || 
|-id=250 bgcolor=#E9E9E9
| 537250 ||  || — || November 1, 2008 || Kitt Peak || Spacewatch ||  || align=right | 1.3 km || 
|-id=251 bgcolor=#d6d6d6
| 537251 ||  || — || October 17, 2012 || Haleakala || Pan-STARRS ||  || align=right | 1.6 km || 
|-id=252 bgcolor=#E9E9E9
| 537252 ||  || — || December 10, 2013 || Mount Lemmon || Mount Lemmon Survey ||  || align=right data-sort-value="0.70" | 700 m || 
|-id=253 bgcolor=#E9E9E9
| 537253 ||  || — || December 3, 2005 || Kitt Peak || Spacewatch ||  || align=right data-sort-value="0.66" | 660 m || 
|-id=254 bgcolor=#E9E9E9
| 537254 ||  || — || April 18, 2015 || Mount Lemmon || Mount Lemmon Survey ||  || align=right data-sort-value="0.94" | 940 m || 
|-id=255 bgcolor=#d6d6d6
| 537255 ||  || — || April 23, 2015 || Haleakala || Pan-STARRS ||  || align=right | 2.1 km || 
|-id=256 bgcolor=#E9E9E9
| 537256 ||  || — || April 23, 2015 || Haleakala || Pan-STARRS ||  || align=right | 1.8 km || 
|-id=257 bgcolor=#d6d6d6
| 537257 ||  || — || April 23, 2015 || Haleakala || Pan-STARRS ||  || align=right | 2.1 km || 
|-id=258 bgcolor=#E9E9E9
| 537258 ||  || — || January 11, 2014 || Kitt Peak || Spacewatch ||  || align=right | 1.8 km || 
|-id=259 bgcolor=#E9E9E9
| 537259 ||  || — || April 25, 2015 || Haleakala || Pan-STARRS ||  || align=right | 1.0 km || 
|-id=260 bgcolor=#E9E9E9
| 537260 ||  || — || October 31, 2013 || Kitt Peak || Spacewatch ||  || align=right data-sort-value="0.84" | 840 m || 
|-id=261 bgcolor=#E9E9E9
| 537261 ||  || — || May 23, 2011 || Mount Lemmon || Mount Lemmon Survey ||  || align=right | 1.1 km || 
|-id=262 bgcolor=#d6d6d6
| 537262 ||  || — || January 28, 2014 || Kitt Peak || Spacewatch ||  || align=right | 2.0 km || 
|-id=263 bgcolor=#d6d6d6
| 537263 ||  || — || March 25, 2014 || Mount Lemmon || Mount Lemmon Survey ||  || align=right | 2.5 km || 
|-id=264 bgcolor=#d6d6d6
| 537264 ||  || — || January 15, 2009 || Kitt Peak || Spacewatch ||  || align=right | 2.0 km || 
|-id=265 bgcolor=#d6d6d6
| 537265 ||  || — || March 4, 2010 || WISE || WISE || Tj (2.98) || align=right | 3.9 km || 
|-id=266 bgcolor=#d6d6d6
| 537266 ||  || — || September 30, 2006 || Mount Lemmon || Mount Lemmon Survey ||  || align=right | 2.9 km || 
|-id=267 bgcolor=#E9E9E9
| 537267 ||  || — || April 25, 2015 || Haleakala || Pan-STARRS ||  || align=right | 1.7 km || 
|-id=268 bgcolor=#E9E9E9
| 537268 ||  || — || March 9, 2011 || Mount Lemmon || Mount Lemmon Survey ||  || align=right | 1.6 km || 
|-id=269 bgcolor=#E9E9E9
| 537269 ||  || — || January 6, 2010 || Kitt Peak || Spacewatch ||  || align=right | 1.5 km || 
|-id=270 bgcolor=#E9E9E9
| 537270 ||  || — || March 18, 2015 || Haleakala || Pan-STARRS ||  || align=right | 1.0 km || 
|-id=271 bgcolor=#fefefe
| 537271 ||  || — || October 7, 2010 || Catalina || CSS || H || align=right data-sort-value="0.77" | 770 m || 
|-id=272 bgcolor=#E9E9E9
| 537272 ||  || — || May 12, 2015 || Mount Lemmon || Mount Lemmon Survey ||  || align=right | 1.2 km || 
|-id=273 bgcolor=#d6d6d6
| 537273 ||  || — || October 15, 2012 || Haleakala || Pan-STARRS ||  || align=right | 2.3 km || 
|-id=274 bgcolor=#E9E9E9
| 537274 ||  || — || December 30, 2013 || Mount Lemmon || Mount Lemmon Survey ||  || align=right | 1.5 km || 
|-id=275 bgcolor=#E9E9E9
| 537275 ||  || — || May 21, 2011 || Mount Lemmon || Mount Lemmon Survey ||  || align=right data-sort-value="0.78" | 780 m || 
|-id=276 bgcolor=#E9E9E9
| 537276 ||  || — || October 10, 2008 || Mount Lemmon || Mount Lemmon Survey ||  || align=right data-sort-value="0.88" | 880 m || 
|-id=277 bgcolor=#d6d6d6
| 537277 ||  || — || September 23, 2011 || Haleakala || Pan-STARRS ||  || align=right | 3.4 km || 
|-id=278 bgcolor=#d6d6d6
| 537278 ||  || — || December 31, 2013 || Haleakala || Pan-STARRS ||  || align=right | 2.3 km || 
|-id=279 bgcolor=#E9E9E9
| 537279 ||  || — || December 11, 2013 || Haleakala || Pan-STARRS ||  || align=right data-sort-value="0.99" | 990 m || 
|-id=280 bgcolor=#d6d6d6
| 537280 ||  || — || November 14, 2012 || Mount Lemmon || Mount Lemmon Survey ||  || align=right | 2.8 km || 
|-id=281 bgcolor=#E9E9E9
| 537281 ||  || — || January 2, 2014 || Mount Lemmon || Mount Lemmon Survey ||  || align=right | 1.4 km || 
|-id=282 bgcolor=#E9E9E9
| 537282 ||  || — || May 15, 2015 || Haleakala || Pan-STARRS ||  || align=right | 1.0 km || 
|-id=283 bgcolor=#d6d6d6
| 537283 ||  || — || May 15, 2015 || Haleakala || Pan-STARRS ||  || align=right | 3.4 km || 
|-id=284 bgcolor=#fefefe
| 537284 ||  || — || November 17, 2008 || Kitt Peak || Spacewatch || H || align=right data-sort-value="0.62" | 620 m || 
|-id=285 bgcolor=#E9E9E9
| 537285 ||  || — || April 3, 2010 || WISE || WISE ||  || align=right | 3.3 km || 
|-id=286 bgcolor=#d6d6d6
| 537286 ||  || — || May 11, 2010 || Mount Lemmon || Mount Lemmon Survey ||  || align=right | 2.5 km || 
|-id=287 bgcolor=#E9E9E9
| 537287 ||  || — || January 20, 2015 || Haleakala || Pan-STARRS ||  || align=right | 1.5 km || 
|-id=288 bgcolor=#E9E9E9
| 537288 ||  || — || August 13, 2012 || Kitt Peak || Spacewatch ||  || align=right | 1.2 km || 
|-id=289 bgcolor=#d6d6d6
| 537289 ||  || — || February 13, 2010 || WISE || WISE ||  || align=right | 3.2 km || 
|-id=290 bgcolor=#d6d6d6
| 537290 ||  || — || March 28, 2015 || Haleakala || Pan-STARRS ||  || align=right | 2.5 km || 
|-id=291 bgcolor=#E9E9E9
| 537291 ||  || — || March 19, 2010 || Mount Lemmon || Mount Lemmon Survey ||  || align=right | 2.1 km || 
|-id=292 bgcolor=#E9E9E9
| 537292 ||  || — || June 5, 2011 || Mount Lemmon || Mount Lemmon Survey ||  || align=right data-sort-value="0.83" | 830 m || 
|-id=293 bgcolor=#E9E9E9
| 537293 ||  || — || September 10, 2007 || Catalina || CSS ||  || align=right | 1.6 km || 
|-id=294 bgcolor=#d6d6d6
| 537294 ||  || — || December 31, 2013 || Kitt Peak || Spacewatch ||  || align=right | 1.6 km || 
|-id=295 bgcolor=#E9E9E9
| 537295 ||  || — || June 26, 2010 || WISE || WISE ||  || align=right | 2.3 km || 
|-id=296 bgcolor=#E9E9E9
| 537296 ||  || — || October 16, 2012 || Mount Lemmon || Mount Lemmon Survey ||  || align=right | 1.3 km || 
|-id=297 bgcolor=#d6d6d6
| 537297 ||  || — || April 14, 2010 || WISE || WISE ||  || align=right | 3.1 km || 
|-id=298 bgcolor=#E9E9E9
| 537298 ||  || — || April 25, 2015 || Haleakala || Pan-STARRS ||  || align=right data-sort-value="0.90" | 900 m || 
|-id=299 bgcolor=#d6d6d6
| 537299 ||  || — || April 20, 2004 || Kitt Peak || Spacewatch ||  || align=right | 2.7 km || 
|-id=300 bgcolor=#E9E9E9
| 537300 ||  || — || January 11, 2010 || Kitt Peak || Spacewatch ||  || align=right data-sort-value="0.79" | 790 m || 
|}

537301–537400 

|-bgcolor=#E9E9E9
| 537301 ||  || — || April 30, 2011 || Haleakala || Pan-STARRS ||  || align=right data-sort-value="0.82" | 820 m || 
|-id=302 bgcolor=#E9E9E9
| 537302 ||  || — || January 26, 2014 || Haleakala || Pan-STARRS ||  || align=right | 2.6 km || 
|-id=303 bgcolor=#d6d6d6
| 537303 ||  || — || March 28, 2015 || Haleakala || Pan-STARRS ||  || align=right | 2.2 km || 
|-id=304 bgcolor=#E9E9E9
| 537304 ||  || — || January 20, 2015 || Haleakala || Pan-STARRS ||  || align=right | 1.6 km || 
|-id=305 bgcolor=#E9E9E9
| 537305 ||  || — || October 22, 2012 || Haleakala || Pan-STARRS ||  || align=right | 2.2 km || 
|-id=306 bgcolor=#E9E9E9
| 537306 ||  || — || March 30, 2015 || Haleakala || Pan-STARRS ||  || align=right | 1.2 km || 
|-id=307 bgcolor=#d6d6d6
| 537307 ||  || — || August 23, 2011 || Haleakala || Pan-STARRS ||  || align=right | 2.5 km || 
|-id=308 bgcolor=#d6d6d6
| 537308 ||  || — || November 2, 2007 || Mount Lemmon || Mount Lemmon Survey ||  || align=right | 2.2 km || 
|-id=309 bgcolor=#E9E9E9
| 537309 ||  || — || September 28, 2003 || Kitt Peak || Spacewatch ||  || align=right | 1.2 km || 
|-id=310 bgcolor=#d6d6d6
| 537310 ||  || — || October 8, 2012 || Haleakala || Pan-STARRS ||  || align=right | 3.0 km || 
|-id=311 bgcolor=#E9E9E9
| 537311 ||  || — || April 9, 2006 || Mount Lemmon || Mount Lemmon Survey ||  || align=right | 1.5 km || 
|-id=312 bgcolor=#E9E9E9
| 537312 ||  || — || May 12, 2015 || Mount Lemmon || Mount Lemmon Survey ||  || align=right | 1.3 km || 
|-id=313 bgcolor=#E9E9E9
| 537313 ||  || — || December 31, 2013 || Haleakala || Pan-STARRS ||  || align=right | 1.4 km || 
|-id=314 bgcolor=#E9E9E9
| 537314 ||  || — || March 2, 2006 || Kitt Peak || Spacewatch ||  || align=right data-sort-value="0.73" | 730 m || 
|-id=315 bgcolor=#d6d6d6
| 537315 ||  || — || February 27, 2010 || WISE || WISE ||  || align=right | 3.1 km || 
|-id=316 bgcolor=#d6d6d6
| 537316 ||  || — || March 21, 2015 || Haleakala || Pan-STARRS || 7:4 || align=right | 3.5 km || 
|-id=317 bgcolor=#E9E9E9
| 537317 ||  || — || October 8, 2012 || Haleakala || Pan-STARRS ||  || align=right data-sort-value="0.99" | 990 m || 
|-id=318 bgcolor=#d6d6d6
| 537318 ||  || — || March 28, 2009 || Catalina || CSS ||  || align=right | 3.3 km || 
|-id=319 bgcolor=#E9E9E9
| 537319 ||  || — || March 21, 2015 || Haleakala || Pan-STARRS ||  || align=right | 1.0 km || 
|-id=320 bgcolor=#d6d6d6
| 537320 ||  || — || March 30, 2015 || Haleakala || Pan-STARRS ||  || align=right | 2.7 km || 
|-id=321 bgcolor=#E9E9E9
| 537321 ||  || — || August 2, 2011 || Haleakala || Pan-STARRS ||  || align=right | 2.0 km || 
|-id=322 bgcolor=#E9E9E9
| 537322 ||  || — || October 4, 1999 || Kitt Peak || Spacewatch ||  || align=right | 1.4 km || 
|-id=323 bgcolor=#E9E9E9
| 537323 ||  || — || May 11, 1994 || Kitt Peak || Spacewatch ||  || align=right | 1.3 km || 
|-id=324 bgcolor=#E9E9E9
| 537324 ||  || — || January 21, 2006 || Kitt Peak || Spacewatch ||  || align=right data-sort-value="0.74" | 740 m || 
|-id=325 bgcolor=#E9E9E9
| 537325 ||  || — || April 17, 2015 || Mount Lemmon || Mount Lemmon Survey ||  || align=right | 1.5 km || 
|-id=326 bgcolor=#E9E9E9
| 537326 ||  || — || January 7, 2010 || Mount Lemmon || Mount Lemmon Survey ||  || align=right | 1.1 km || 
|-id=327 bgcolor=#E9E9E9
| 537327 ||  || — || November 8, 2008 || Mount Lemmon || Mount Lemmon Survey ||  || align=right | 1.0 km || 
|-id=328 bgcolor=#d6d6d6
| 537328 ||  || — || April 18, 2015 || Kitt Peak || Spacewatch ||  || align=right | 2.1 km || 
|-id=329 bgcolor=#E9E9E9
| 537329 ||  || — || March 25, 2006 || Kitt Peak || Spacewatch ||  || align=right | 1.2 km || 
|-id=330 bgcolor=#E9E9E9
| 537330 ||  || — || October 10, 2007 || Mount Lemmon || Mount Lemmon Survey ||  || align=right data-sort-value="0.95" | 950 m || 
|-id=331 bgcolor=#d6d6d6
| 537331 ||  || — || January 11, 1994 || Kitt Peak || Spacewatch || 7:4 || align=right | 3.0 km || 
|-id=332 bgcolor=#E9E9E9
| 537332 ||  || — || March 24, 2015 || Mount Lemmon || Mount Lemmon Survey ||  || align=right | 1.1 km || 
|-id=333 bgcolor=#d6d6d6
| 537333 ||  || — || April 18, 2015 || Kitt Peak || Spacewatch ||  || align=right | 2.7 km || 
|-id=334 bgcolor=#E9E9E9
| 537334 ||  || — || January 22, 2015 || Haleakala || Pan-STARRS ||  || align=right | 1.2 km || 
|-id=335 bgcolor=#E9E9E9
| 537335 ||  || — || August 24, 2011 || Haleakala || Pan-STARRS ||  || align=right | 2.2 km || 
|-id=336 bgcolor=#E9E9E9
| 537336 ||  || — || March 19, 2010 || Catalina || CSS ||  || align=right | 1.7 km || 
|-id=337 bgcolor=#E9E9E9
| 537337 ||  || — || March 12, 2010 || Kitt Peak || Spacewatch ||  || align=right | 1.9 km || 
|-id=338 bgcolor=#d6d6d6
| 537338 ||  || — || May 14, 2015 || Haleakala || Pan-STARRS ||  || align=right | 2.3 km || 
|-id=339 bgcolor=#d6d6d6
| 537339 ||  || — || April 23, 2015 || Haleakala || Pan-STARRS ||  || align=right | 2.2 km || 
|-id=340 bgcolor=#d6d6d6
| 537340 ||  || — || October 20, 2011 || Mount Lemmon || Mount Lemmon Survey ||  || align=right | 2.4 km || 
|-id=341 bgcolor=#E9E9E9
| 537341 ||  || — || October 10, 2007 || Mount Lemmon || Mount Lemmon Survey || EUN || align=right | 1.0 km || 
|-id=342 bgcolor=#FFC2E0
| 537342 ||  || — || May 22, 2015 || Catalina || CSS || APO || align=right data-sort-value="0.29" | 290 m || 
|-id=343 bgcolor=#E9E9E9
| 537343 ||  || — || October 17, 2012 || Haleakala || Pan-STARRS ||  || align=right | 1.9 km || 
|-id=344 bgcolor=#E9E9E9
| 537344 ||  || — || October 8, 2012 || Kitt Peak || Spacewatch ||  || align=right data-sort-value="0.85" | 850 m || 
|-id=345 bgcolor=#E9E9E9
| 537345 ||  || — || March 18, 2010 || Kitt Peak || Spacewatch ||  || align=right | 1.6 km || 
|-id=346 bgcolor=#E9E9E9
| 537346 ||  || — || June 7, 2011 || Mount Lemmon || Mount Lemmon Survey ||  || align=right data-sort-value="0.73" | 730 m || 
|-id=347 bgcolor=#d6d6d6
| 537347 ||  || — || June 27, 2010 || WISE || WISE ||  || align=right | 3.6 km || 
|-id=348 bgcolor=#E9E9E9
| 537348 ||  || — || September 11, 2007 || Catalina || CSS ||  || align=right | 1.8 km || 
|-id=349 bgcolor=#E9E9E9
| 537349 ||  || — || November 27, 2013 || Haleakala || Pan-STARRS ||  || align=right | 1.2 km || 
|-id=350 bgcolor=#E9E9E9
| 537350 ||  || — || March 21, 2015 || Haleakala || Pan-STARRS ||  || align=right data-sort-value="0.85" | 850 m || 
|-id=351 bgcolor=#d6d6d6
| 537351 ||  || — || May 13, 2015 || Mount Lemmon || Mount Lemmon Survey || EOS || align=right | 1.6 km || 
|-id=352 bgcolor=#E9E9E9
| 537352 ||  || — || December 5, 2012 || Mount Lemmon || Mount Lemmon Survey ||  || align=right | 1.0 km || 
|-id=353 bgcolor=#E9E9E9
| 537353 ||  || — || May 3, 2010 || WISE || WISE ||  || align=right | 2.7 km || 
|-id=354 bgcolor=#fefefe
| 537354 ||  || — || February 27, 2012 || Haleakala || Pan-STARRS || H || align=right data-sort-value="0.54" | 540 m || 
|-id=355 bgcolor=#fefefe
| 537355 ||  || — || November 16, 2010 || Mount Lemmon || Mount Lemmon Survey || H || align=right data-sort-value="0.76" | 760 m || 
|-id=356 bgcolor=#d6d6d6
| 537356 ||  || — || October 17, 2010 || Mount Lemmon || Mount Lemmon Survey || 3:2 || align=right | 4.3 km || 
|-id=357 bgcolor=#d6d6d6
| 537357 ||  || — || March 15, 2009 || Mount Lemmon || Mount Lemmon Survey ||  || align=right | 1.9 km || 
|-id=358 bgcolor=#E9E9E9
| 537358 ||  || — || November 27, 2013 || Haleakala || Pan-STARRS ||  || align=right | 1.2 km || 
|-id=359 bgcolor=#d6d6d6
| 537359 ||  || — || February 24, 2014 || Haleakala || Pan-STARRS ||  || align=right | 2.3 km || 
|-id=360 bgcolor=#d6d6d6
| 537360 ||  || — || September 24, 2011 || Haleakala || Pan-STARRS ||  || align=right | 2.4 km || 
|-id=361 bgcolor=#d6d6d6
| 537361 ||  || — || December 23, 2012 || Haleakala || Pan-STARRS ||  || align=right | 2.9 km || 
|-id=362 bgcolor=#d6d6d6
| 537362 ||  || — || September 26, 2011 || Mount Lemmon || Mount Lemmon Survey ||  || align=right | 2.5 km || 
|-id=363 bgcolor=#E9E9E9
| 537363 ||  || — || May 21, 2015 || Haleakala || Pan-STARRS ||  || align=right | 1.5 km || 
|-id=364 bgcolor=#E9E9E9
| 537364 ||  || — || May 21, 2015 || Haleakala || Pan-STARRS ||  || align=right | 1.9 km || 
|-id=365 bgcolor=#d6d6d6
| 537365 ||  || — || December 30, 2007 || Mount Lemmon || Mount Lemmon Survey ||  || align=right | 2.4 km || 
|-id=366 bgcolor=#d6d6d6
| 537366 ||  || — || December 12, 2012 || Mount Lemmon || Mount Lemmon Survey ||  || align=right | 2.6 km || 
|-id=367 bgcolor=#E9E9E9
| 537367 ||  || — || November 7, 2012 || Mount Lemmon || Mount Lemmon Survey ||  || align=right | 1.5 km || 
|-id=368 bgcolor=#d6d6d6
| 537368 ||  || — || February 11, 2008 || Mount Lemmon || Mount Lemmon Survey ||  || align=right | 3.5 km || 
|-id=369 bgcolor=#E9E9E9
| 537369 ||  || — || November 2, 2008 || Mount Lemmon || Mount Lemmon Survey ||  || align=right | 1.3 km || 
|-id=370 bgcolor=#E9E9E9
| 537370 ||  || — || November 4, 2012 || Mount Lemmon || Mount Lemmon Survey ||  || align=right | 1.2 km || 
|-id=371 bgcolor=#d6d6d6
| 537371 ||  || — || January 16, 2008 || Kitt Peak || Spacewatch ||  || align=right | 3.0 km || 
|-id=372 bgcolor=#d6d6d6
| 537372 ||  || — || May 21, 2015 || Haleakala || Pan-STARRS ||  || align=right | 2.6 km || 
|-id=373 bgcolor=#d6d6d6
| 537373 ||  || — || August 30, 2000 || Kitt Peak || Spacewatch ||  || align=right | 2.6 km || 
|-id=374 bgcolor=#E9E9E9
| 537374 ||  || — || November 19, 2008 || Kitt Peak || Spacewatch ||  || align=right | 1.2 km || 
|-id=375 bgcolor=#d6d6d6
| 537375 ||  || — || January 17, 2013 || Haleakala || Pan-STARRS ||  || align=right | 2.8 km || 
|-id=376 bgcolor=#E9E9E9
| 537376 ||  || — || May 11, 2015 || Mount Lemmon || Mount Lemmon Survey ||  || align=right | 1.2 km || 
|-id=377 bgcolor=#d6d6d6
| 537377 ||  || — || May 18, 2015 || Haleakala || Pan-STARRS ||  || align=right | 2.3 km || 
|-id=378 bgcolor=#E9E9E9
| 537378 ||  || — || January 3, 2014 || Kitt Peak || Spacewatch ||  || align=right | 1.6 km || 
|-id=379 bgcolor=#E9E9E9
| 537379 ||  || — || May 21, 2015 || Haleakala || Pan-STARRS ||  || align=right | 1.2 km || 
|-id=380 bgcolor=#E9E9E9
| 537380 ||  || — || October 17, 2012 || Haleakala || Pan-STARRS ||  || align=right | 1.5 km || 
|-id=381 bgcolor=#E9E9E9
| 537381 ||  || — || May 24, 2015 || Haleakala || Pan-STARRS ||  || align=right | 1.1 km || 
|-id=382 bgcolor=#E9E9E9
| 537382 ||  || — || December 22, 2005 || Kitt Peak || Spacewatch ||  || align=right data-sort-value="0.75" | 750 m || 
|-id=383 bgcolor=#d6d6d6
| 537383 ||  || — || May 25, 2015 || Haleakala || Pan-STARRS ||  || align=right | 2.4 km || 
|-id=384 bgcolor=#E9E9E9
| 537384 ||  || — || May 25, 2015 || Haleakala || Pan-STARRS ||  || align=right | 2.1 km || 
|-id=385 bgcolor=#d6d6d6
| 537385 ||  || — || May 26, 2015 || Haleakala || Pan-STARRS ||  || align=right | 3.7 km || 
|-id=386 bgcolor=#E9E9E9
| 537386 ||  || — || May 25, 2015 || Haleakala || Pan-STARRS ||  || align=right | 1.4 km || 
|-id=387 bgcolor=#E9E9E9
| 537387 ||  || — || December 31, 2008 || Kitt Peak || Spacewatch ||  || align=right | 2.2 km || 
|-id=388 bgcolor=#d6d6d6
| 537388 ||  || — || November 11, 2006 || Mount Lemmon || Mount Lemmon Survey ||  || align=right | 2.9 km || 
|-id=389 bgcolor=#d6d6d6
| 537389 ||  || — || December 11, 2012 || Mount Lemmon || Mount Lemmon Survey ||  || align=right | 2.9 km || 
|-id=390 bgcolor=#d6d6d6
| 537390 ||  || — || May 21, 2015 || Haleakala || Pan-STARRS ||  || align=right | 2.1 km || 
|-id=391 bgcolor=#d6d6d6
| 537391 ||  || — || May 21, 2015 || Haleakala || Pan-STARRS ||  || align=right | 2.6 km || 
|-id=392 bgcolor=#d6d6d6
| 537392 ||  || — || May 24, 2015 || Haleakala || Pan-STARRS ||  || align=right | 2.3 km || 
|-id=393 bgcolor=#E9E9E9
| 537393 ||  || — || May 29, 2015 || Haleakala || Pan-STARRS ||  || align=right | 1.5 km || 
|-id=394 bgcolor=#E9E9E9
| 537394 ||  || — || July 28, 2011 || Haleakala || Pan-STARRS ||  || align=right | 1.3 km || 
|-id=395 bgcolor=#FFC2E0
| 537395 ||  || — || June 5, 2015 || Haleakala || Pan-STARRS || AMOPHA || align=right data-sort-value="0.31" | 310 m || 
|-id=396 bgcolor=#E9E9E9
| 537396 ||  || — || April 30, 2010 || WISE || WISE ||  || align=right | 1.9 km || 
|-id=397 bgcolor=#d6d6d6
| 537397 ||  || — || August 26, 2011 || Haleakala || Pan-STARRS ||  || align=right | 2.9 km || 
|-id=398 bgcolor=#fefefe
| 537398 ||  || — || April 24, 2012 || Haleakala || Pan-STARRS || H || align=right data-sort-value="0.60" | 600 m || 
|-id=399 bgcolor=#E9E9E9
| 537399 ||  || — || December 24, 2013 || Mount Lemmon || Mount Lemmon Survey ||  || align=right | 1.6 km || 
|-id=400 bgcolor=#fefefe
| 537400 ||  || — || December 13, 2013 || Mount Lemmon || Mount Lemmon Survey || H || align=right data-sort-value="0.45" | 450 m || 
|}

537401–537500 

|-bgcolor=#E9E9E9
| 537401 ||  || — || January 23, 2006 || Kitt Peak || Spacewatch ||  || align=right | 1.4 km || 
|-id=402 bgcolor=#E9E9E9
| 537402 ||  || — || September 20, 2003 || Kitt Peak || Spacewatch ||  || align=right data-sort-value="0.86" | 860 m || 
|-id=403 bgcolor=#E9E9E9
| 537403 ||  || — || May 2, 2006 || Kitt Peak || Spacewatch ||  || align=right | 1.7 km || 
|-id=404 bgcolor=#E9E9E9
| 537404 ||  || — || May 5, 2006 || Mount Lemmon || Mount Lemmon Survey ||  || align=right | 1.2 km || 
|-id=405 bgcolor=#E9E9E9
| 537405 ||  || — || February 25, 2006 || Kitt Peak || Spacewatch ||  || align=right | 1.4 km || 
|-id=406 bgcolor=#E9E9E9
| 537406 ||  || — || February 27, 2014 || Mount Lemmon || Mount Lemmon Survey ||  || align=right | 2.2 km || 
|-id=407 bgcolor=#d6d6d6
| 537407 ||  || — || April 21, 2010 || WISE || WISE ||  || align=right | 3.0 km || 
|-id=408 bgcolor=#E9E9E9
| 537408 ||  || — || February 19, 2010 || Catalina || CSS ||  || align=right | 2.3 km || 
|-id=409 bgcolor=#d6d6d6
| 537409 ||  || — || September 8, 2011 || Haleakala || Pan-STARRS ||  || align=right | 3.1 km || 
|-id=410 bgcolor=#d6d6d6
| 537410 ||  || — || May 4, 2009 || Mount Lemmon || Mount Lemmon Survey ||  || align=right | 2.2 km || 
|-id=411 bgcolor=#E9E9E9
| 537411 ||  || — || August 2, 2011 || Haleakala || Pan-STARRS ||  || align=right | 2.4 km || 
|-id=412 bgcolor=#FA8072
| 537412 ||  || — || November 27, 2013 || Haleakala || Pan-STARRS || H || align=right data-sort-value="0.52" | 520 m || 
|-id=413 bgcolor=#d6d6d6
| 537413 ||  || — || October 25, 2011 || Haleakala || Pan-STARRS ||  || align=right | 3.1 km || 
|-id=414 bgcolor=#E9E9E9
| 537414 ||  || — || September 27, 2011 || Mount Lemmon || Mount Lemmon Survey ||  || align=right | 1.9 km || 
|-id=415 bgcolor=#E9E9E9
| 537415 ||  || — || December 22, 2005 || Kitt Peak || Spacewatch ||  || align=right data-sort-value="0.94" | 940 m || 
|-id=416 bgcolor=#fefefe
| 537416 ||  || — || November 10, 2013 || Mount Lemmon || Mount Lemmon Survey || H || align=right data-sort-value="0.72" | 720 m || 
|-id=417 bgcolor=#E9E9E9
| 537417 ||  || — || July 10, 2007 || Siding Spring || SSS ||  || align=right data-sort-value="0.92" | 920 m || 
|-id=418 bgcolor=#E9E9E9
| 537418 ||  || — || April 25, 2006 || Kitt Peak || Spacewatch ||  || align=right | 1.5 km || 
|-id=419 bgcolor=#E9E9E9
| 537419 ||  || — || April 18, 2015 || Haleakala || Pan-STARRS ||  || align=right | 1.7 km || 
|-id=420 bgcolor=#E9E9E9
| 537420 ||  || — || October 20, 2012 || Haleakala || Pan-STARRS ||  || align=right | 2.5 km || 
|-id=421 bgcolor=#fefefe
| 537421 ||  || — || June 10, 2012 || Mount Lemmon || Mount Lemmon Survey || H || align=right data-sort-value="0.72" | 720 m || 
|-id=422 bgcolor=#d6d6d6
| 537422 ||  || — || March 12, 2008 || Kitt Peak || Spacewatch ||  || align=right | 2.9 km || 
|-id=423 bgcolor=#E9E9E9
| 537423 ||  || — || October 14, 2007 || Mount Lemmon || Mount Lemmon Survey ||  || align=right | 1.9 km || 
|-id=424 bgcolor=#d6d6d6
| 537424 ||  || — || June 13, 2015 || Haleakala || Pan-STARRS ||  || align=right | 1.9 km || 
|-id=425 bgcolor=#d6d6d6
| 537425 ||  || — || September 26, 2011 || Haleakala || Pan-STARRS ||  || align=right | 2.7 km || 
|-id=426 bgcolor=#d6d6d6
| 537426 ||  || — || January 10, 2008 || Mount Lemmon || Mount Lemmon Survey ||  || align=right | 4.1 km || 
|-id=427 bgcolor=#d6d6d6
| 537427 ||  || — || January 18, 2013 || Mount Lemmon || Mount Lemmon Survey ||  || align=right | 3.2 km || 
|-id=428 bgcolor=#d6d6d6
| 537428 ||  || — || April 4, 2014 || XuYi || PMO NEO ||  || align=right | 3.2 km || 
|-id=429 bgcolor=#d6d6d6
| 537429 ||  || — || September 5, 2010 || Mount Lemmon || Mount Lemmon Survey ||  || align=right | 2.6 km || 
|-id=430 bgcolor=#d6d6d6
| 537430 ||  || — || June 13, 2015 || Haleakala || Pan-STARRS ||  || align=right | 3.2 km || 
|-id=431 bgcolor=#E9E9E9
| 537431 ||  || — || August 29, 2006 || Kitt Peak || Spacewatch ||  || align=right | 2.3 km || 
|-id=432 bgcolor=#E9E9E9
| 537432 ||  || — || June 10, 2015 || Haleakala || Pan-STARRS ||  || align=right | 1.6 km || 
|-id=433 bgcolor=#E9E9E9
| 537433 ||  || — || March 5, 2006 || Kitt Peak || Spacewatch ||  || align=right | 1.1 km || 
|-id=434 bgcolor=#d6d6d6
| 537434 ||  || — || February 15, 2013 || Haleakala || Pan-STARRS ||  || align=right | 2.7 km || 
|-id=435 bgcolor=#E9E9E9
| 537435 ||  || — || June 7, 2015 || Mount Lemmon || Mount Lemmon Survey ||  || align=right | 1.0 km || 
|-id=436 bgcolor=#d6d6d6
| 537436 ||  || — || March 19, 2009 || Mount Lemmon || Mount Lemmon Survey ||  || align=right | 2.1 km || 
|-id=437 bgcolor=#d6d6d6
| 537437 ||  || — || February 14, 2013 || Kitt Peak || Spacewatch ||  || align=right | 2.7 km || 
|-id=438 bgcolor=#d6d6d6
| 537438 ||  || — || December 23, 2012 || Haleakala || Pan-STARRS ||  || align=right | 2.9 km || 
|-id=439 bgcolor=#d6d6d6
| 537439 ||  || — || June 15, 2015 || Mount Lemmon || Mount Lemmon Survey ||  || align=right | 2.6 km || 
|-id=440 bgcolor=#d6d6d6
| 537440 ||  || — || October 25, 2011 || Haleakala || Pan-STARRS ||  || align=right | 2.0 km || 
|-id=441 bgcolor=#d6d6d6
| 537441 ||  || — || December 23, 2012 || Haleakala || Pan-STARRS ||  || align=right | 2.1 km || 
|-id=442 bgcolor=#E9E9E9
| 537442 ||  || — || November 27, 2013 || Haleakala || Pan-STARRS ||  || align=right | 1.4 km || 
|-id=443 bgcolor=#d6d6d6
| 537443 ||  || — || June 13, 2015 || Haleakala || Pan-STARRS ||  || align=right | 1.8 km || 
|-id=444 bgcolor=#E9E9E9
| 537444 ||  || — || November 8, 2007 || Kitt Peak || Spacewatch ||  || align=right | 2.0 km || 
|-id=445 bgcolor=#E9E9E9
| 537445 ||  || — || January 2, 2009 || Mount Lemmon || Mount Lemmon Survey ||  || align=right | 1.1 km || 
|-id=446 bgcolor=#E9E9E9
| 537446 ||  || — || May 3, 2006 || Mount Lemmon || Mount Lemmon Survey ||  || align=right | 1.6 km || 
|-id=447 bgcolor=#d6d6d6
| 537447 ||  || — || December 1, 2005 || Socorro || LINEAR ||  || align=right | 3.7 km || 
|-id=448 bgcolor=#d6d6d6
| 537448 ||  || — || June 13, 2015 || Mount Lemmon || Mount Lemmon Survey ||  || align=right | 2.3 km || 
|-id=449 bgcolor=#E9E9E9
| 537449 ||  || — || April 20, 2006 || Kitt Peak || Spacewatch ||  || align=right | 1.2 km || 
|-id=450 bgcolor=#d6d6d6
| 537450 ||  || — || December 14, 2001 || Kitt Peak || Spacewatch ||  || align=right | 3.7 km || 
|-id=451 bgcolor=#E9E9E9
| 537451 ||  || — || June 15, 2010 || WISE || WISE ||  || align=right | 2.2 km || 
|-id=452 bgcolor=#E9E9E9
| 537452 ||  || — || January 1, 2014 || Kitt Peak || Spacewatch ||  || align=right | 1.2 km || 
|-id=453 bgcolor=#d6d6d6
| 537453 ||  || — || June 16, 2015 || Haleakala || Pan-STARRS ||  || align=right | 2.7 km || 
|-id=454 bgcolor=#E9E9E9
| 537454 ||  || — || February 26, 2009 || Kitt Peak || Spacewatch ||  || align=right | 1.9 km || 
|-id=455 bgcolor=#d6d6d6
| 537455 ||  || — || February 2, 2002 || Cima Ekar || ADAS ||  || align=right | 3.1 km || 
|-id=456 bgcolor=#E9E9E9
| 537456 ||  || — || August 2, 2011 || Haleakala || Pan-STARRS ||  || align=right data-sort-value="0.92" | 920 m || 
|-id=457 bgcolor=#fefefe
| 537457 ||  || — || May 22, 2015 || Haleakala || Pan-STARRS || H || align=right data-sort-value="0.57" | 570 m || 
|-id=458 bgcolor=#E9E9E9
| 537458 ||  || — || October 27, 2008 || Mount Lemmon || Mount Lemmon Survey ||  || align=right | 2.3 km || 
|-id=459 bgcolor=#E9E9E9
| 537459 ||  || — || April 24, 2015 || Haleakala || Pan-STARRS ||  || align=right | 1.5 km || 
|-id=460 bgcolor=#E9E9E9
| 537460 ||  || — || October 9, 2012 || Mount Lemmon || Mount Lemmon Survey ||  || align=right data-sort-value="0.84" | 840 m || 
|-id=461 bgcolor=#E9E9E9
| 537461 ||  || — || May 12, 2015 || Mount Lemmon || Mount Lemmon Survey ||  || align=right | 2.1 km || 
|-id=462 bgcolor=#d6d6d6
| 537462 ||  || — || January 3, 2014 || Mount Lemmon || Mount Lemmon Survey ||  || align=right | 2.4 km || 
|-id=463 bgcolor=#d6d6d6
| 537463 ||  || — || February 23, 2010 || WISE || WISE ||  || align=right | 1.8 km || 
|-id=464 bgcolor=#d6d6d6
| 537464 ||  || — || March 21, 2009 || Kitt Peak || Spacewatch ||  || align=right | 2.0 km || 
|-id=465 bgcolor=#d6d6d6
| 537465 ||  || — || July 7, 2010 || WISE || WISE ||  || align=right | 3.6 km || 
|-id=466 bgcolor=#d6d6d6
| 537466 ||  || — || May 6, 2003 || Kitt Peak || Spacewatch ||  || align=right | 2.5 km || 
|-id=467 bgcolor=#FFC2E0
| 537467 ||  || — || June 20, 2015 || Haleakala || Pan-STARRS || AMO || align=right data-sort-value="0.30" | 300 m || 
|-id=468 bgcolor=#E9E9E9
| 537468 ||  || — || May 29, 2011 || Mount Lemmon || Mount Lemmon Survey ||  || align=right | 1.5 km || 
|-id=469 bgcolor=#d6d6d6
| 537469 ||  || — || January 15, 2008 || Kitt Peak || Spacewatch ||  || align=right | 2.7 km || 
|-id=470 bgcolor=#d6d6d6
| 537470 ||  || — || May 5, 2014 || Haleakala || Pan-STARRS ||  || align=right | 3.2 km || 
|-id=471 bgcolor=#d6d6d6
| 537471 ||  || — || June 27, 2010 || WISE || WISE || Tj (2.99) || align=right | 3.0 km || 
|-id=472 bgcolor=#fefefe
| 537472 ||  || — || November 3, 2007 || Catalina || CSS || H || align=right data-sort-value="0.66" | 660 m || 
|-id=473 bgcolor=#E9E9E9
| 537473 ||  || — || July 24, 2010 || WISE || WISE ||  || align=right | 2.7 km || 
|-id=474 bgcolor=#d6d6d6
| 537474 ||  || — || July 25, 2010 || WISE || WISE || 7:4 || align=right | 4.0 km || 
|-id=475 bgcolor=#d6d6d6
| 537475 ||  || — || February 2, 2008 || Kitt Peak || Spacewatch ||  || align=right | 2.6 km || 
|-id=476 bgcolor=#fefefe
| 537476 ||  || — || December 2, 2013 || XuYi || PMO NEO || H || align=right data-sort-value="0.66" | 660 m || 
|-id=477 bgcolor=#E9E9E9
| 537477 ||  || — || June 13, 2010 || Mount Lemmon || Mount Lemmon Survey ||  || align=right | 1.5 km || 
|-id=478 bgcolor=#d6d6d6
| 537478 ||  || — || April 22, 2014 || Mount Lemmon || Mount Lemmon Survey ||  || align=right | 2.5 km || 
|-id=479 bgcolor=#E9E9E9
| 537479 ||  || — || March 25, 2010 || Mount Lemmon || Mount Lemmon Survey ||  || align=right | 1.2 km || 
|-id=480 bgcolor=#d6d6d6
| 537480 ||  || — || February 2, 2008 || Catalina || CSS ||  || align=right | 3.1 km || 
|-id=481 bgcolor=#fefefe
| 537481 ||  || — || February 24, 2006 || Mount Lemmon || Mount Lemmon Survey || H || align=right data-sort-value="0.44" | 440 m || 
|-id=482 bgcolor=#E9E9E9
| 537482 ||  || — || March 22, 2015 || Mount Lemmon || Mount Lemmon Survey ||  || align=right data-sort-value="0.98" | 980 m || 
|-id=483 bgcolor=#d6d6d6
| 537483 ||  || — || August 29, 2005 || Kitt Peak || Spacewatch ||  || align=right | 2.7 km || 
|-id=484 bgcolor=#E9E9E9
| 537484 ||  || — || January 31, 2009 || Mount Lemmon || Mount Lemmon Survey ||  || align=right | 2.1 km || 
|-id=485 bgcolor=#FA8072
| 537485 ||  || — || July 8, 2010 || Kitt Peak || Spacewatch ||  || align=right | 2.6 km || 
|-id=486 bgcolor=#d6d6d6
| 537486 ||  || — || April 7, 2014 || Mount Lemmon || Mount Lemmon Survey ||  || align=right | 2.9 km || 
|-id=487 bgcolor=#E9E9E9
| 537487 ||  || — || June 26, 2015 || Haleakala || Pan-STARRS || AST || align=right | 1.6 km || 
|-id=488 bgcolor=#d6d6d6
| 537488 ||  || — || October 24, 2011 || Haleakala || Pan-STARRS ||  || align=right | 1.8 km || 
|-id=489 bgcolor=#E9E9E9
| 537489 ||  || — || April 9, 2010 || Kitt Peak || Spacewatch ||  || align=right | 1.6 km || 
|-id=490 bgcolor=#E9E9E9
| 537490 ||  || — || April 6, 2005 || Kitt Peak || Spacewatch ||  || align=right | 1.9 km || 
|-id=491 bgcolor=#fefefe
| 537491 ||  || — || February 9, 2010 || Mount Lemmon || Mount Lemmon Survey ||  || align=right data-sort-value="0.88" | 880 m || 
|-id=492 bgcolor=#d6d6d6
| 537492 ||  || — || December 27, 2011 || Mount Lemmon || Mount Lemmon Survey ||  || align=right | 3.2 km || 
|-id=493 bgcolor=#d6d6d6
| 537493 ||  || — || May 22, 2010 || WISE || WISE ||  || align=right | 2.9 km || 
|-id=494 bgcolor=#d6d6d6
| 537494 ||  || — || June 29, 2015 || Haleakala || Pan-STARRS ||  || align=right | 2.5 km || 
|-id=495 bgcolor=#d6d6d6
| 537495 ||  || — || February 20, 2014 || Haleakala || Pan-STARRS ||  || align=right | 2.5 km || 
|-id=496 bgcolor=#d6d6d6
| 537496 ||  || — || May 5, 2014 || Haleakala || Pan-STARRS ||  || align=right | 3.1 km || 
|-id=497 bgcolor=#E9E9E9
| 537497 ||  || — || April 24, 2011 || Haleakala || Pan-STARRS ||  || align=right data-sort-value="0.94" | 940 m || 
|-id=498 bgcolor=#FA8072
| 537498 ||  || — || January 1, 2014 || Haleakala || Pan-STARRS || H || align=right data-sort-value="0.45" | 450 m || 
|-id=499 bgcolor=#fefefe
| 537499 ||  || — || February 20, 2014 || Mount Lemmon || Mount Lemmon Survey ||  || align=right data-sort-value="0.67" | 670 m || 
|-id=500 bgcolor=#fefefe
| 537500 ||  || — || December 31, 2013 || Kitt Peak || Spacewatch || H || align=right data-sort-value="0.51" | 510 m || 
|}

537501–537600 

|-bgcolor=#fefefe
| 537501 ||  || — || June 30, 2015 || Haleakala || Pan-STARRS || H || align=right data-sort-value="0.72" | 720 m || 
|-id=502 bgcolor=#fefefe
| 537502 ||  || — || March 2, 2009 || Mount Lemmon || Mount Lemmon Survey || H || align=right data-sort-value="0.54" | 540 m || 
|-id=503 bgcolor=#d6d6d6
| 537503 ||  || — || January 11, 2008 || Kitt Peak || Spacewatch ||  || align=right | 4.0 km || 
|-id=504 bgcolor=#E9E9E9
| 537504 ||  || — || February 27, 2014 || Haleakala || Pan-STARRS ||  || align=right | 1.8 km || 
|-id=505 bgcolor=#E9E9E9
| 537505 ||  || — || June 21, 2015 || Mount Lemmon || Mount Lemmon Survey ||  || align=right | 2.2 km || 
|-id=506 bgcolor=#d6d6d6
| 537506 ||  || — || June 20, 2015 || Haleakala || Pan-STARRS ||  || align=right | 2.8 km || 
|-id=507 bgcolor=#E9E9E9
| 537507 ||  || — || September 30, 2011 || Kitt Peak || Spacewatch ||  || align=right | 1.7 km || 
|-id=508 bgcolor=#d6d6d6
| 537508 ||  || — || January 24, 2012 || Haleakala || Pan-STARRS ||  || align=right | 2.9 km || 
|-id=509 bgcolor=#d6d6d6
| 537509 ||  || — || November 6, 2010 || Mount Lemmon || Mount Lemmon Survey ||  || align=right | 2.6 km || 
|-id=510 bgcolor=#E9E9E9
| 537510 ||  || — || April 7, 2006 || Anderson Mesa || LONEOS ||  || align=right | 1.6 km || 
|-id=511 bgcolor=#d6d6d6
| 537511 ||  || — || June 16, 2010 || WISE || WISE ||  || align=right | 3.4 km || 
|-id=512 bgcolor=#d6d6d6
| 537512 ||  || — || June 9, 2010 || WISE || WISE ||  || align=right | 2.8 km || 
|-id=513 bgcolor=#d6d6d6
| 537513 ||  || — || June 25, 2015 || Haleakala || Pan-STARRS ||  || align=right | 3.7 km || 
|-id=514 bgcolor=#d6d6d6
| 537514 ||  || — || October 21, 2011 || Mount Lemmon || Mount Lemmon Survey ||  || align=right | 2.5 km || 
|-id=515 bgcolor=#E9E9E9
| 537515 ||  || — || March 10, 2014 || Mount Lemmon || Mount Lemmon Survey ||  || align=right | 2.2 km || 
|-id=516 bgcolor=#d6d6d6
| 537516 ||  || — || November 25, 2011 || Haleakala || Pan-STARRS ||  || align=right | 2.8 km || 
|-id=517 bgcolor=#d6d6d6
| 537517 ||  || — || January 2, 2012 || Kitt Peak || Spacewatch || 7:4 || align=right | 3.7 km || 
|-id=518 bgcolor=#d6d6d6
| 537518 ||  || — || February 28, 2008 || Kitt Peak || Spacewatch ||  || align=right | 3.0 km || 
|-id=519 bgcolor=#d6d6d6
| 537519 ||  || — || June 17, 2015 || Haleakala || Pan-STARRS ||  || align=right | 2.2 km || 
|-id=520 bgcolor=#E9E9E9
| 537520 ||  || — || March 30, 2010 || WISE || WISE ||  || align=right | 2.0 km || 
|-id=521 bgcolor=#d6d6d6
| 537521 ||  || — || September 23, 2005 || Kitt Peak || Spacewatch ||  || align=right | 2.4 km || 
|-id=522 bgcolor=#E9E9E9
| 537522 ||  || — || February 22, 2010 || WISE || WISE ||  || align=right | 1.6 km || 
|-id=523 bgcolor=#d6d6d6
| 537523 ||  || — || October 26, 2011 || Haleakala || Pan-STARRS ||  || align=right | 2.2 km || 
|-id=524 bgcolor=#d6d6d6
| 537524 ||  || — || November 26, 2012 || Mount Lemmon || Mount Lemmon Survey ||  || align=right | 2.2 km || 
|-id=525 bgcolor=#d6d6d6
| 537525 ||  || — || October 29, 2010 || Mount Lemmon || Mount Lemmon Survey ||  || align=right | 2.6 km || 
|-id=526 bgcolor=#d6d6d6
| 537526 ||  || — || January 3, 2012 || Mount Lemmon || Mount Lemmon Survey ||  || align=right | 4.1 km || 
|-id=527 bgcolor=#d6d6d6
| 537527 ||  || — || June 22, 2015 || Haleakala || Pan-STARRS ||  || align=right | 2.5 km || 
|-id=528 bgcolor=#d6d6d6
| 537528 ||  || — || August 13, 2010 || Kitt Peak || Spacewatch ||  || align=right | 2.4 km || 
|-id=529 bgcolor=#d6d6d6
| 537529 ||  || — || October 11, 2010 || Kitt Peak || Spacewatch ||  || align=right | 2.3 km || 
|-id=530 bgcolor=#d6d6d6
| 537530 ||  || — || September 17, 2010 || Kitt Peak || Spacewatch ||  || align=right | 2.3 km || 
|-id=531 bgcolor=#d6d6d6
| 537531 ||  || — || October 25, 2005 || Kitt Peak || Spacewatch ||  || align=right | 2.3 km || 
|-id=532 bgcolor=#d6d6d6
| 537532 ||  || — || July 7, 2010 || Kitt Peak || Spacewatch ||  || align=right | 2.9 km || 
|-id=533 bgcolor=#E9E9E9
| 537533 ||  || — || August 26, 2011 || Haleakala || Pan-STARRS ||  || align=right | 1.3 km || 
|-id=534 bgcolor=#E9E9E9
| 537534 ||  || — || February 28, 2014 || Haleakala || Pan-STARRS ||  || align=right | 1.8 km || 
|-id=535 bgcolor=#d6d6d6
| 537535 ||  || — || June 5, 2014 || Mount Lemmon || Mount Lemmon Survey ||  || align=right | 2.4 km || 
|-id=536 bgcolor=#d6d6d6
| 537536 ||  || — || February 28, 2014 || Haleakala || Pan-STARRS ||  || align=right | 2.1 km || 
|-id=537 bgcolor=#d6d6d6
| 537537 ||  || — || April 29, 2014 || Haleakala || Pan-STARRS ||  || align=right | 2.3 km || 
|-id=538 bgcolor=#E9E9E9
| 537538 ||  || — || June 15, 2015 || Haleakala || Pan-STARRS ||  || align=right | 1.7 km || 
|-id=539 bgcolor=#d6d6d6
| 537539 ||  || — || May 9, 2014 || Haleakala || Pan-STARRS ||  || align=right | 2.7 km || 
|-id=540 bgcolor=#d6d6d6
| 537540 ||  || — || May 4, 2014 || Haleakala || Pan-STARRS ||  || align=right | 2.2 km || 
|-id=541 bgcolor=#d6d6d6
| 537541 ||  || — || August 10, 2004 || Campo Imperatore || CINEOS ||  || align=right | 2.6 km || 
|-id=542 bgcolor=#d6d6d6
| 537542 ||  || — || April 16, 2010 || WISE || WISE ||  || align=right | 3.2 km || 
|-id=543 bgcolor=#d6d6d6
| 537543 ||  || — || June 29, 2010 || WISE || WISE ||  || align=right | 3.0 km || 
|-id=544 bgcolor=#FA8072
| 537544 ||  || — || June 26, 2015 || Haleakala || Pan-STARRS || H || align=right data-sort-value="0.53" | 530 m || 
|-id=545 bgcolor=#d6d6d6
| 537545 ||  || — || June 13, 2015 || Haleakala || Pan-STARRS ||  || align=right | 2.7 km || 
|-id=546 bgcolor=#E9E9E9
| 537546 ||  || — || March 15, 2010 || Kitt Peak || Spacewatch ||  || align=right | 1.9 km || 
|-id=547 bgcolor=#d6d6d6
| 537547 ||  || — || April 9, 2014 || Mount Lemmon || Mount Lemmon Survey ||  || align=right | 3.4 km || 
|-id=548 bgcolor=#E9E9E9
| 537548 ||  || — || March 20, 2010 || Kitt Peak || Spacewatch ||  || align=right | 2.1 km || 
|-id=549 bgcolor=#E9E9E9
| 537549 ||  || — || October 26, 2011 || Haleakala || Pan-STARRS ||  || align=right | 1.9 km || 
|-id=550 bgcolor=#fefefe
| 537550 ||  || — || June 19, 2009 || Mount Lemmon || Mount Lemmon Survey || H || align=right data-sort-value="0.81" | 810 m || 
|-id=551 bgcolor=#fefefe
| 537551 ||  || — || January 16, 2004 || Kitt Peak || Spacewatch || H || align=right data-sort-value="0.67" | 670 m || 
|-id=552 bgcolor=#d6d6d6
| 537552 ||  || — || January 10, 2013 || Haleakala || Pan-STARRS ||  || align=right | 2.5 km || 
|-id=553 bgcolor=#fefefe
| 537553 ||  || — || July 23, 2015 || Haleakala || Pan-STARRS ||  || align=right data-sort-value="0.67" | 670 m || 
|-id=554 bgcolor=#d6d6d6
| 537554 ||  || — || June 26, 2010 || WISE || WISE ||  || align=right | 3.3 km || 
|-id=555 bgcolor=#d6d6d6
| 537555 ||  || — || April 5, 2014 || Haleakala || Pan-STARRS ||  || align=right | 3.2 km || 
|-id=556 bgcolor=#d6d6d6
| 537556 ||  || — || July 23, 2010 || WISE || WISE ||  || align=right | 3.1 km || 
|-id=557 bgcolor=#d6d6d6
| 537557 ||  || — || February 10, 2014 || Haleakala || Pan-STARRS ||  || align=right | 2.7 km || 
|-id=558 bgcolor=#fefefe
| 537558 ||  || — || July 1, 2005 || Kitt Peak || Spacewatch ||  || align=right data-sort-value="0.90" | 900 m || 
|-id=559 bgcolor=#E9E9E9
| 537559 ||  || — || June 18, 2015 || Haleakala || Pan-STARRS ||  || align=right | 1.8 km || 
|-id=560 bgcolor=#d6d6d6
| 537560 ||  || — || February 9, 2013 || Haleakala || Pan-STARRS ||  || align=right | 2.2 km || 
|-id=561 bgcolor=#d6d6d6
| 537561 ||  || — || March 8, 2013 || Haleakala || Pan-STARRS ||  || align=right | 3.0 km || 
|-id=562 bgcolor=#FA8072
| 537562 ||  || — || November 8, 2012 || Socorro || LINEAR ||  || align=right data-sort-value="0.77" | 770 m || 
|-id=563 bgcolor=#fefefe
| 537563 ||  || — || January 3, 2014 || Catalina || CSS || H || align=right data-sort-value="0.56" | 560 m || 
|-id=564 bgcolor=#fefefe
| 537564 ||  || — || July 23, 2015 || Haleakala || Pan-STARRS || H || align=right data-sort-value="0.68" | 680 m || 
|-id=565 bgcolor=#fefefe
| 537565 ||  || — || September 14, 2007 || Mount Lemmon || Mount Lemmon Survey || H || align=right data-sort-value="0.60" | 600 m || 
|-id=566 bgcolor=#FA8072
| 537566 ||  || — || December 1, 2008 || Mount Lemmon || Mount Lemmon Survey || H || align=right data-sort-value="0.40" | 400 m || 
|-id=567 bgcolor=#fefefe
| 537567 ||  || — || April 2, 2014 || Mount Lemmon || Mount Lemmon Survey || H || align=right data-sort-value="0.65" | 650 m || 
|-id=568 bgcolor=#fefefe
| 537568 ||  || — || February 19, 2009 || Kitt Peak || Spacewatch || H || align=right data-sort-value="0.50" | 500 m || 
|-id=569 bgcolor=#d6d6d6
| 537569 ||  || — || June 14, 2010 || WISE || WISE ||  || align=right | 2.0 km || 
|-id=570 bgcolor=#d6d6d6
| 537570 ||  || — || October 10, 2010 || Kitt Peak || Spacewatch ||  || align=right | 2.5 km || 
|-id=571 bgcolor=#d6d6d6
| 537571 ||  || — || December 13, 2006 || Mount Lemmon || Mount Lemmon Survey ||  || align=right | 3.2 km || 
|-id=572 bgcolor=#d6d6d6
| 537572 ||  || — || April 6, 2008 || Kitt Peak || Spacewatch ||  || align=right | 3.1 km || 
|-id=573 bgcolor=#E9E9E9
| 537573 ||  || — || May 13, 2010 || Mount Lemmon || Mount Lemmon Survey ||  || align=right | 1.8 km || 
|-id=574 bgcolor=#d6d6d6
| 537574 ||  || — || October 13, 2010 || Mount Lemmon || Mount Lemmon Survey ||  || align=right | 2.4 km || 
|-id=575 bgcolor=#d6d6d6
| 537575 ||  || — || April 29, 2014 || Haleakala || Pan-STARRS ||  || align=right | 2.0 km || 
|-id=576 bgcolor=#d6d6d6
| 537576 ||  || — || May 6, 2014 || Mount Lemmon || Mount Lemmon Survey ||  || align=right | 1.8 km || 
|-id=577 bgcolor=#d6d6d6
| 537577 ||  || — || October 10, 2010 || Kitt Peak || Spacewatch ||  || align=right | 2.9 km || 
|-id=578 bgcolor=#d6d6d6
| 537578 ||  || — || February 15, 2013 || Haleakala || Pan-STARRS ||  || align=right | 2.5 km || 
|-id=579 bgcolor=#d6d6d6
| 537579 ||  || — || March 31, 2008 || Kitt Peak || Spacewatch ||  || align=right | 2.5 km || 
|-id=580 bgcolor=#d6d6d6
| 537580 ||  || — || March 28, 2014 || Mount Lemmon || Mount Lemmon Survey ||  || align=right | 1.8 km || 
|-id=581 bgcolor=#d6d6d6
| 537581 ||  || — || July 23, 2015 || Haleakala || Pan-STARRS ||  || align=right | 2.5 km || 
|-id=582 bgcolor=#d6d6d6
| 537582 ||  || — || March 5, 2013 || Haleakala || Pan-STARRS ||  || align=right | 2.4 km || 
|-id=583 bgcolor=#d6d6d6
| 537583 ||  || — || February 2, 2008 || Kitt Peak || Spacewatch ||  || align=right | 2.4 km || 
|-id=584 bgcolor=#d6d6d6
| 537584 ||  || — || July 24, 2010 || WISE || WISE ||  || align=right | 2.2 km || 
|-id=585 bgcolor=#d6d6d6
| 537585 ||  || — || March 1, 2008 || Kitt Peak || Spacewatch ||  || align=right | 2.3 km || 
|-id=586 bgcolor=#d6d6d6
| 537586 ||  || — || April 10, 2014 || Haleakala || Pan-STARRS ||  || align=right | 2.2 km || 
|-id=587 bgcolor=#d6d6d6
| 537587 ||  || — || November 4, 2010 || Mount Lemmon || Mount Lemmon Survey ||  || align=right | 2.6 km || 
|-id=588 bgcolor=#d6d6d6
| 537588 ||  || — || April 4, 2014 || Haleakala || Pan-STARRS ||  || align=right | 1.9 km || 
|-id=589 bgcolor=#d6d6d6
| 537589 ||  || — || January 20, 2013 || Kitt Peak || Spacewatch ||  || align=right | 2.3 km || 
|-id=590 bgcolor=#d6d6d6
| 537590 ||  || — || February 17, 2013 || Kitt Peak || Spacewatch ||  || align=right | 2.5 km || 
|-id=591 bgcolor=#d6d6d6
| 537591 ||  || — || March 27, 2014 || Haleakala || Pan-STARRS ||  || align=right | 1.8 km || 
|-id=592 bgcolor=#d6d6d6
| 537592 ||  || — || March 5, 2013 || Mount Lemmon || Mount Lemmon Survey ||  || align=right | 2.6 km || 
|-id=593 bgcolor=#d6d6d6
| 537593 ||  || — || February 2, 2008 || Kitt Peak || Spacewatch ||  || align=right | 2.9 km || 
|-id=594 bgcolor=#d6d6d6
| 537594 ||  || — || February 15, 2013 || Haleakala || Pan-STARRS ||  || align=right | 2.4 km || 
|-id=595 bgcolor=#E9E9E9
| 537595 ||  || — || June 19, 2015 || Mount Lemmon || Mount Lemmon Survey ||  || align=right | 2.4 km || 
|-id=596 bgcolor=#d6d6d6
| 537596 ||  || — || November 6, 2005 || Kitt Peak || Spacewatch ||  || align=right | 2.9 km || 
|-id=597 bgcolor=#d6d6d6
| 537597 ||  || — || March 6, 2013 || Haleakala || Pan-STARRS ||  || align=right | 2.8 km || 
|-id=598 bgcolor=#d6d6d6
| 537598 ||  || — || April 2, 2014 || Mount Lemmon || Mount Lemmon Survey ||  || align=right | 2.8 km || 
|-id=599 bgcolor=#d6d6d6
| 537599 ||  || — || February 14, 2013 || Haleakala || Pan-STARRS ||  || align=right | 2.2 km || 
|-id=600 bgcolor=#d6d6d6
| 537600 ||  || — || June 27, 2010 || WISE || WISE ||  || align=right | 2.4 km || 
|}

537601–537700 

|-bgcolor=#d6d6d6
| 537601 ||  || — || February 26, 2014 || Haleakala || Pan-STARRS ||  || align=right | 2.3 km || 
|-id=602 bgcolor=#d6d6d6
| 537602 ||  || — || November 20, 2006 || Kitt Peak || Spacewatch ||  || align=right | 2.0 km || 
|-id=603 bgcolor=#d6d6d6
| 537603 ||  || — || April 29, 2014 || Haleakala || Pan-STARRS ||  || align=right | 2.1 km || 
|-id=604 bgcolor=#d6d6d6
| 537604 ||  || — || October 14, 2010 || Mount Lemmon || Mount Lemmon Survey ||  || align=right | 2.2 km || 
|-id=605 bgcolor=#d6d6d6
| 537605 ||  || — || July 15, 2010 || WISE || WISE ||  || align=right | 2.2 km || 
|-id=606 bgcolor=#d6d6d6
| 537606 ||  || — || September 15, 2010 || Mount Lemmon || Mount Lemmon Survey ||  || align=right | 2.5 km || 
|-id=607 bgcolor=#E9E9E9
| 537607 ||  || — || February 27, 2014 || Mount Lemmon || Mount Lemmon Survey || DOR || align=right | 1.8 km || 
|-id=608 bgcolor=#d6d6d6
| 537608 ||  || — || July 26, 1998 || Kitt Peak || Spacewatch ||  || align=right | 3.4 km || 
|-id=609 bgcolor=#d6d6d6
| 537609 ||  || — || October 22, 2005 || Kitt Peak || Spacewatch ||  || align=right | 2.5 km || 
|-id=610 bgcolor=#d6d6d6
| 537610 ||  || — || May 27, 2014 || Haleakala || Pan-STARRS ||  || align=right | 3.0 km || 
|-id=611 bgcolor=#E9E9E9
| 537611 ||  || — || August 7, 2010 || WISE || WISE ||  || align=right | 2.1 km || 
|-id=612 bgcolor=#d6d6d6
| 537612 ||  || — || November 6, 2010 || Mount Lemmon || Mount Lemmon Survey ||  || align=right | 3.0 km || 
|-id=613 bgcolor=#fefefe
| 537613 ||  || — || September 18, 2010 || Mount Lemmon || Mount Lemmon Survey || H || align=right data-sort-value="0.67" | 670 m || 
|-id=614 bgcolor=#d6d6d6
| 537614 ||  || — || October 7, 2004 || Socorro || LINEAR ||  || align=right | 2.5 km || 
|-id=615 bgcolor=#d6d6d6
| 537615 ||  || — || August 5, 2010 || WISE || WISE ||  || align=right | 3.7 km || 
|-id=616 bgcolor=#d6d6d6
| 537616 ||  || — || October 12, 2005 || Kitt Peak || Spacewatch || EOS || align=right | 1.4 km || 
|-id=617 bgcolor=#d6d6d6
| 537617 ||  || — || August 6, 2010 || WISE || WISE ||  || align=right | 3.0 km || 
|-id=618 bgcolor=#d6d6d6
| 537618 ||  || — || July 14, 2004 || Siding Spring || SSS ||  || align=right | 2.8 km || 
|-id=619 bgcolor=#fefefe
| 537619 ||  || — || August 3, 2015 || Haleakala || Pan-STARRS || H || align=right data-sort-value="0.74" | 740 m || 
|-id=620 bgcolor=#FA8072
| 537620 ||  || — || August 31, 2005 || Kitt Peak || Spacewatch || H || align=right data-sort-value="0.54" | 540 m || 
|-id=621 bgcolor=#E9E9E9
| 537621 ||  || — || August 3, 2015 || Haleakala || Pan-STARRS ||  || align=right | 1.6 km || 
|-id=622 bgcolor=#d6d6d6
| 537622 ||  || — || September 17, 2010 || Mount Lemmon || Mount Lemmon Survey ||  || align=right | 1.9 km || 
|-id=623 bgcolor=#d6d6d6
| 537623 ||  || — || April 30, 2014 || Haleakala || Pan-STARRS ||  || align=right | 2.2 km || 
|-id=624 bgcolor=#d6d6d6
| 537624 ||  || — || February 14, 2013 || Kitt Peak || Spacewatch ||  || align=right | 2.6 km || 
|-id=625 bgcolor=#d6d6d6
| 537625 ||  || — || November 1, 2010 || Mount Lemmon || Mount Lemmon Survey ||  || align=right | 3.2 km || 
|-id=626 bgcolor=#d6d6d6
| 537626 ||  || — || March 25, 2003 || Kitt Peak || Spacewatch ||  || align=right | 2.2 km || 
|-id=627 bgcolor=#d6d6d6
| 537627 ||  || — || August 31, 2005 || Kitt Peak || Spacewatch ||  || align=right | 2.0 km || 
|-id=628 bgcolor=#d6d6d6
| 537628 ||  || — || February 15, 2013 || Haleakala || Pan-STARRS ||  || align=right | 2.5 km || 
|-id=629 bgcolor=#d6d6d6
| 537629 ||  || — || September 16, 2010 || Mount Lemmon || Mount Lemmon Survey ||  || align=right | 2.4 km || 
|-id=630 bgcolor=#d6d6d6
| 537630 ||  || — || June 28, 2015 || Haleakala || Pan-STARRS ||  || align=right | 2.8 km || 
|-id=631 bgcolor=#d6d6d6
| 537631 ||  || — || February 5, 2013 || Mount Lemmon || Mount Lemmon Survey ||  || align=right | 2.9 km || 
|-id=632 bgcolor=#fefefe
| 537632 ||  || — || November 25, 2013 || Haleakala || Pan-STARRS || H || align=right data-sort-value="0.65" | 650 m || 
|-id=633 bgcolor=#d6d6d6
| 537633 ||  || — || March 5, 2013 || Haleakala || Pan-STARRS ||  || align=right | 2.2 km || 
|-id=634 bgcolor=#d6d6d6
| 537634 ||  || — || October 1, 2010 || Kitt Peak || Spacewatch ||  || align=right | 2.1 km || 
|-id=635 bgcolor=#d6d6d6
| 537635 ||  || — || April 3, 2014 || Haleakala || Pan-STARRS ||  || align=right | 2.9 km || 
|-id=636 bgcolor=#d6d6d6
| 537636 ||  || — || September 16, 2010 || Mount Lemmon || Mount Lemmon Survey ||  || align=right | 2.1 km || 
|-id=637 bgcolor=#d6d6d6
| 537637 ||  || — || October 29, 2010 || Mount Lemmon || Mount Lemmon Survey ||  || align=right | 2.1 km || 
|-id=638 bgcolor=#d6d6d6
| 537638 ||  || — || February 10, 2014 || Haleakala || Pan-STARRS ||  || align=right | 2.5 km || 
|-id=639 bgcolor=#d6d6d6
| 537639 ||  || — || August 21, 2015 || Haleakala || Pan-STARRS ||  || align=right | 2.8 km || 
|-id=640 bgcolor=#d6d6d6
| 537640 ||  || — || October 17, 2010 || Mount Lemmon || Mount Lemmon Survey ||  || align=right | 2.4 km || 
|-id=641 bgcolor=#FA8072
| 537641 ||  || — || September 17, 2010 || Socorro || LINEAR || H || align=right data-sort-value="0.68" | 680 m || 
|-id=642 bgcolor=#fefefe
| 537642 ||  || — || December 14, 2013 || Haleakala || Pan-STARRS || H || align=right data-sort-value="0.51" | 510 m || 
|-id=643 bgcolor=#d6d6d6
| 537643 ||  || — || January 9, 2013 || Mount Lemmon || Mount Lemmon Survey ||  || align=right | 3.4 km || 
|-id=644 bgcolor=#d6d6d6
| 537644 ||  || — || January 17, 2013 || Haleakala || Pan-STARRS ||  || align=right | 2.1 km || 
|-id=645 bgcolor=#d6d6d6
| 537645 ||  || — || May 27, 2014 || Haleakala || Pan-STARRS ||  || align=right | 2.4 km || 
|-id=646 bgcolor=#d6d6d6
| 537646 ||  || — || July 24, 2010 || WISE || WISE ||  || align=right | 2.7 km || 
|-id=647 bgcolor=#d6d6d6
| 537647 ||  || — || August 16, 2009 || Kitt Peak || Spacewatch ||  || align=right | 2.5 km || 
|-id=648 bgcolor=#d6d6d6
| 537648 ||  || — || September 15, 2009 || Kitt Peak || Spacewatch || 7:4 || align=right | 2.4 km || 
|-id=649 bgcolor=#fefefe
| 537649 ||  || — || April 14, 2012 || Haleakala || Pan-STARRS || H || align=right data-sort-value="0.66" | 660 m || 
|-id=650 bgcolor=#fefefe
| 537650 ||  || — || July 30, 2012 || Haleakala || Pan-STARRS || H || align=right data-sort-value="0.71" | 710 m || 
|-id=651 bgcolor=#fefefe
| 537651 ||  || — || January 13, 2014 || Mount Lemmon || Mount Lemmon Survey || H || align=right data-sort-value="0.55" | 550 m || 
|-id=652 bgcolor=#d6d6d6
| 537652 ||  || — || May 24, 2010 || WISE || WISE ||  || align=right | 2.1 km || 
|-id=653 bgcolor=#d6d6d6
| 537653 ||  || — || September 13, 1998 || Kitt Peak || Spacewatch ||  || align=right | 3.0 km || 
|-id=654 bgcolor=#d6d6d6
| 537654 ||  || — || November 4, 2005 || Kitt Peak || Spacewatch ||  || align=right | 2.3 km || 
|-id=655 bgcolor=#fefefe
| 537655 ||  || — || April 9, 2006 || Mount Lemmon || Mount Lemmon Survey || H || align=right data-sort-value="0.71" | 710 m || 
|-id=656 bgcolor=#d6d6d6
| 537656 ||  || — || August 7, 2010 || WISE || WISE ||  || align=right | 3.2 km || 
|-id=657 bgcolor=#fefefe
| 537657 ||  || — || January 30, 2011 || Catalina || CSS ||  || align=right data-sort-value="0.71" | 710 m || 
|-id=658 bgcolor=#d6d6d6
| 537658 ||  || — || February 25, 2007 || Mount Lemmon || Mount Lemmon Survey || EOS || align=right | 1.8 km || 
|-id=659 bgcolor=#d6d6d6
| 537659 ||  || — || February 14, 2013 || Kitt Peak || Spacewatch ||  || align=right | 2.6 km || 
|-id=660 bgcolor=#fefefe
| 537660 ||  || — || October 14, 2010 || Mount Lemmon || Mount Lemmon Survey || H || align=right data-sort-value="0.57" | 570 m || 
|-id=661 bgcolor=#d6d6d6
| 537661 ||  || — || August 20, 2009 || Kitt Peak || Spacewatch ||  || align=right | 2.5 km || 
|-id=662 bgcolor=#d6d6d6
| 537662 ||  || — || August 19, 2009 || La Sagra || OAM Obs. ||  || align=right | 2.5 km || 
|-id=663 bgcolor=#fefefe
| 537663 ||  || — || March 19, 2009 || Kitt Peak || Spacewatch || H || align=right data-sort-value="0.58" | 580 m || 
|-id=664 bgcolor=#fefefe
| 537664 ||  || — || September 6, 2015 || Haleakala || Pan-STARRS || H || align=right data-sort-value="0.65" | 650 m || 
|-id=665 bgcolor=#fefefe
| 537665 ||  || — || April 29, 2014 || Haleakala || Pan-STARRS || H || align=right data-sort-value="0.61" | 610 m || 
|-id=666 bgcolor=#fefefe
| 537666 ||  || — || March 24, 2014 || Haleakala || Pan-STARRS || H || align=right data-sort-value="0.49" | 490 m || 
|-id=667 bgcolor=#fefefe
| 537667 ||  || — || April 17, 2009 || Kitt Peak || Spacewatch || H || align=right data-sort-value="0.60" | 600 m || 
|-id=668 bgcolor=#fefefe
| 537668 ||  || — || September 12, 2015 || Haleakala || Pan-STARRS || H || align=right data-sort-value="0.58" | 580 m || 
|-id=669 bgcolor=#d6d6d6
| 537669 ||  || — || February 23, 2007 || Mount Lemmon || Mount Lemmon Survey ||  || align=right | 2.6 km || 
|-id=670 bgcolor=#d6d6d6
| 537670 ||  || — || March 5, 2013 || Haleakala || Pan-STARRS ||  || align=right | 2.1 km || 
|-id=671 bgcolor=#d6d6d6
| 537671 ||  || — || June 5, 2014 || Haleakala || Pan-STARRS ||  || align=right | 2.3 km || 
|-id=672 bgcolor=#d6d6d6
| 537672 ||  || — || September 8, 2015 || Haleakala || Pan-STARRS ||  || align=right | 3.1 km || 
|-id=673 bgcolor=#d6d6d6
| 537673 ||  || — || March 15, 2008 || Mount Lemmon || Mount Lemmon Survey ||  || align=right | 2.0 km || 
|-id=674 bgcolor=#d6d6d6
| 537674 ||  || — || September 11, 2004 || Kitt Peak || Spacewatch ||  || align=right | 2.4 km || 
|-id=675 bgcolor=#d6d6d6
| 537675 ||  || — || January 18, 2012 || Mount Lemmon || Mount Lemmon Survey ||  || align=right | 3.3 km || 
|-id=676 bgcolor=#d6d6d6
| 537676 ||  || — || April 30, 2014 || Haleakala || Pan-STARRS ||  || align=right | 1.8 km || 
|-id=677 bgcolor=#d6d6d6
| 537677 ||  || — || April 10, 2013 || Haleakala || Pan-STARRS ||  || align=right | 3.3 km || 
|-id=678 bgcolor=#d6d6d6
| 537678 ||  || — || September 17, 2010 || Mount Lemmon || Mount Lemmon Survey ||  || align=right | 2.5 km || 
|-id=679 bgcolor=#d6d6d6
| 537679 ||  || — || November 4, 2010 || Mount Lemmon || Mount Lemmon Survey ||  || align=right | 2.9 km || 
|-id=680 bgcolor=#d6d6d6
| 537680 ||  || — || September 5, 2015 || Haleakala || Pan-STARRS ||  || align=right | 3.3 km || 
|-id=681 bgcolor=#d6d6d6
| 537681 ||  || — || October 19, 2010 || Mount Lemmon || Mount Lemmon Survey ||  || align=right | 2.9 km || 
|-id=682 bgcolor=#fefefe
| 537682 ||  || — || November 19, 2007 || Mount Lemmon || Mount Lemmon Survey || H || align=right data-sort-value="0.55" | 550 m || 
|-id=683 bgcolor=#d6d6d6
| 537683 ||  || — || October 9, 2004 || Kitt Peak || Spacewatch ||  || align=right | 2.8 km || 
|-id=684 bgcolor=#E9E9E9
| 537684 ||  || — || September 19, 2006 || Catalina || CSS ||  || align=right | 2.5 km || 
|-id=685 bgcolor=#fefefe
| 537685 ||  || — || October 21, 2007 || Catalina || CSS || H || align=right data-sort-value="0.87" | 870 m || 
|-id=686 bgcolor=#FFC2E0
| 537686 ||  || — || September 25, 2015 || Catalina || CSS || AMOcritical || align=right data-sort-value="0.59" | 590 m || 
|-id=687 bgcolor=#d6d6d6
| 537687 ||  || — || November 1, 2010 || Kitt Peak || Spacewatch ||  || align=right | 2.4 km || 
|-id=688 bgcolor=#fefefe
| 537688 ||  || — || August 22, 2015 || Catalina || CSS || H || align=right data-sort-value="0.77" | 770 m || 
|-id=689 bgcolor=#fefefe
| 537689 ||  || — || October 27, 2012 || Haleakala || Pan-STARRS || H || align=right data-sort-value="0.86" | 860 m || 
|-id=690 bgcolor=#fefefe
| 537690 ||  || — || September 19, 2015 || Haleakala || Pan-STARRS || H || align=right data-sort-value="0.59" | 590 m || 
|-id=691 bgcolor=#d6d6d6
| 537691 ||  || — || February 1, 2012 || Mount Lemmon || Mount Lemmon Survey ||  || align=right | 2.7 km || 
|-id=692 bgcolor=#fefefe
| 537692 ||  || — || June 8, 2014 || Haleakala || Pan-STARRS ||  || align=right data-sort-value="0.69" | 690 m || 
|-id=693 bgcolor=#d6d6d6
| 537693 ||  || — || October 31, 2010 || Mount Lemmon || Mount Lemmon Survey ||  || align=right | 2.6 km || 
|-id=694 bgcolor=#d6d6d6
| 537694 ||  || — || September 30, 2010 || Mount Lemmon || Mount Lemmon Survey ||  || align=right | 2.0 km || 
|-id=695 bgcolor=#d6d6d6
| 537695 ||  || — || September 23, 2015 || Haleakala || Pan-STARRS ||  || align=right | 3.1 km || 
|-id=696 bgcolor=#d6d6d6
| 537696 ||  || — || May 16, 2008 || Kitt Peak || Spacewatch ||  || align=right | 2.8 km || 
|-id=697 bgcolor=#fefefe
| 537697 ||  || — || November 6, 2005 || Kitt Peak || Spacewatch ||  || align=right data-sort-value="0.89" | 890 m || 
|-id=698 bgcolor=#FA8072
| 537698 ||  || — || February 16, 2012 || Haleakala || Pan-STARRS ||  || align=right data-sort-value="0.45" | 450 m || 
|-id=699 bgcolor=#d6d6d6
| 537699 ||  || — || October 12, 2010 || Mount Lemmon || Mount Lemmon Survey ||  || align=right | 2.4 km || 
|-id=700 bgcolor=#fefefe
| 537700 ||  || — || January 21, 2014 || Haleakala || Pan-STARRS || H || align=right data-sort-value="0.62" | 620 m || 
|}

537701–537800 

|-bgcolor=#fefefe
| 537701 ||  || — || October 28, 2005 || Catalina || CSS || H || align=right data-sort-value="0.72" | 720 m || 
|-id=702 bgcolor=#FA8072
| 537702 ||  || — || November 18, 2006 || Mount Lemmon || Mount Lemmon Survey ||  || align=right data-sort-value="0.64" | 640 m || 
|-id=703 bgcolor=#FA8072
| 537703 ||  || — || October 9, 2012 || Haleakala || Pan-STARRS ||  || align=right data-sort-value="0.75" | 750 m || 
|-id=704 bgcolor=#d6d6d6
| 537704 ||  || — || February 10, 2008 || Mount Lemmon || Mount Lemmon Survey ||  || align=right | 3.0 km || 
|-id=705 bgcolor=#d6d6d6
| 537705 ||  || — || September 19, 2003 || Kitt Peak || Spacewatch ||  || align=right | 2.4 km || 
|-id=706 bgcolor=#fefefe
| 537706 ||  || — || December 1, 2006 || Mount Lemmon || Mount Lemmon Survey ||  || align=right data-sort-value="0.56" | 560 m || 
|-id=707 bgcolor=#fefefe
| 537707 ||  || — || January 18, 2013 || Haleakala || Pan-STARRS ||  || align=right data-sort-value="0.56" | 560 m || 
|-id=708 bgcolor=#fefefe
| 537708 ||  || — || May 17, 2014 || Haleakala || Pan-STARRS || H || align=right data-sort-value="0.68" | 680 m || 
|-id=709 bgcolor=#fefefe
| 537709 ||  || — || October 11, 2015 || Mount Lemmon || Mount Lemmon Survey || H || align=right data-sort-value="0.70" | 700 m || 
|-id=710 bgcolor=#E9E9E9
| 537710 ||  || — || May 20, 2010 || WISE || WISE ||  || align=right | 1.7 km || 
|-id=711 bgcolor=#fefefe
| 537711 ||  || — || June 21, 2007 || Mount Lemmon || Mount Lemmon Survey ||  || align=right data-sort-value="0.91" | 910 m || 
|-id=712 bgcolor=#fefefe
| 537712 ||  || — || November 15, 2010 || Mount Lemmon || Mount Lemmon Survey || H || align=right data-sort-value="0.55" | 550 m || 
|-id=713 bgcolor=#d6d6d6
| 537713 ||  || — || August 26, 2009 || Catalina || CSS ||  || align=right | 2.8 km || 
|-id=714 bgcolor=#fefefe
| 537714 ||  || — || March 28, 2014 || Mount Lemmon || Mount Lemmon Survey || H || align=right data-sort-value="0.52" | 520 m || 
|-id=715 bgcolor=#fefefe
| 537715 ||  || — || September 13, 2015 || Catalina || CSS || H || align=right data-sort-value="0.69" | 690 m || 
|-id=716 bgcolor=#E9E9E9
| 537716 ||  || — || November 25, 2006 || Kitt Peak || Spacewatch ||  || align=right | 1.7 km || 
|-id=717 bgcolor=#FA8072
| 537717 ||  || — || March 8, 2014 || Mount Lemmon || Mount Lemmon Survey || H || align=right data-sort-value="0.55" | 550 m || 
|-id=718 bgcolor=#E9E9E9
| 537718 ||  || — || January 20, 2009 || Catalina || CSS ||  || align=right | 1.5 km || 
|-id=719 bgcolor=#d6d6d6
| 537719 ||  || — || September 15, 2009 || Kitt Peak || Spacewatch ||  || align=right | 2.9 km || 
|-id=720 bgcolor=#d6d6d6
| 537720 ||  || — || December 6, 2010 || Mount Lemmon || Mount Lemmon Survey ||  || align=right | 2.1 km || 
|-id=721 bgcolor=#FA8072
| 537721 ||  || — || October 18, 1996 || Xinglong || SCAP ||  || align=right data-sort-value="0.64" | 640 m || 
|-id=722 bgcolor=#fefefe
| 537722 ||  || — || November 7, 2007 || Kitt Peak || Spacewatch || H || align=right data-sort-value="0.69" | 690 m || 
|-id=723 bgcolor=#fefefe
| 537723 ||  || — || October 8, 2004 || Socorro || LINEAR || H || align=right data-sort-value="0.66" | 660 m || 
|-id=724 bgcolor=#d6d6d6
| 537724 ||  || — || September 14, 1998 || Kitt Peak || Spacewatch ||  || align=right | 2.6 km || 
|-id=725 bgcolor=#FA8072
| 537725 ||  || — || October 3, 1999 || Socorro || LINEAR ||  || align=right data-sort-value="0.57" | 570 m || 
|-id=726 bgcolor=#d6d6d6
| 537726 ||  || — || August 28, 2009 || Catalina || CSS ||  || align=right | 2.4 km || 
|-id=727 bgcolor=#FA8072
| 537727 ||  || — || March 16, 2009 || Kitt Peak || Spacewatch || H || align=right data-sort-value="0.54" | 540 m || 
|-id=728 bgcolor=#fefefe
| 537728 ||  || — || May 6, 2014 || Mount Lemmon || Mount Lemmon Survey || H || align=right data-sort-value="0.71" | 710 m || 
|-id=729 bgcolor=#fefefe
| 537729 ||  || — || June 30, 2015 || Haleakala || Pan-STARRS ||  || align=right data-sort-value="0.83" | 830 m || 
|-id=730 bgcolor=#fefefe
| 537730 ||  || — || December 9, 2010 || Mount Lemmon || Mount Lemmon Survey || H || align=right data-sort-value="0.69" | 690 m || 
|-id=731 bgcolor=#fefefe
| 537731 ||  || — || May 25, 2009 || Kitt Peak || Spacewatch || H || align=right data-sort-value="0.62" | 620 m || 
|-id=732 bgcolor=#d6d6d6
| 537732 ||  || — || October 4, 2004 || Kitt Peak || Spacewatch || VER || align=right | 2.5 km || 
|-id=733 bgcolor=#FA8072
| 537733 ||  || — || September 18, 1999 || Catalina || CSS ||  || align=right data-sort-value="0.50" | 500 m || 
|-id=734 bgcolor=#fefefe
| 537734 ||  || — || December 15, 2010 || Mount Lemmon || Mount Lemmon Survey || H || align=right data-sort-value="0.83" | 830 m || 
|-id=735 bgcolor=#fefefe
| 537735 ||  || — || June 19, 2009 || Mount Lemmon || Mount Lemmon Survey || H || align=right data-sort-value="0.65" | 650 m || 
|-id=736 bgcolor=#fefefe
| 537736 ||  || — || August 7, 2012 || Haleakala || Pan-STARRS || H || align=right data-sort-value="0.68" | 680 m || 
|-id=737 bgcolor=#fefefe
| 537737 ||  || — || October 10, 2015 || Haleakala || Pan-STARRS || H || align=right data-sort-value="0.63" | 630 m || 
|-id=738 bgcolor=#fefefe
| 537738 ||  || — || September 10, 2015 || Haleakala || Pan-STARRS || H || align=right data-sort-value="0.60" | 600 m || 
|-id=739 bgcolor=#d6d6d6
| 537739 ||  || — || April 3, 2008 || Kitt Peak || Spacewatch ||  || align=right | 2.5 km || 
|-id=740 bgcolor=#fefefe
| 537740 ||  || — || April 21, 2009 || Mount Lemmon || Mount Lemmon Survey ||  || align=right | 1.2 km || 
|-id=741 bgcolor=#d6d6d6
| 537741 ||  || — || March 8, 2013 || Haleakala || Pan-STARRS ||  || align=right | 2.7 km || 
|-id=742 bgcolor=#d6d6d6
| 537742 ||  || — || March 29, 2008 || Kitt Peak || Spacewatch ||  || align=right | 2.4 km || 
|-id=743 bgcolor=#d6d6d6
| 537743 ||  || — || April 26, 2008 || Kitt Peak || Spacewatch || Tj (2.99) || align=right | 3.3 km || 
|-id=744 bgcolor=#d6d6d6
| 537744 ||  || — || May 24, 2014 || Haleakala || Pan-STARRS ||  || align=right | 1.9 km || 
|-id=745 bgcolor=#d6d6d6
| 537745 ||  || — || October 19, 2010 || Mount Lemmon || Mount Lemmon Survey ||  || align=right | 2.0 km || 
|-id=746 bgcolor=#fefefe
| 537746 ||  || — || October 18, 2015 || Haleakala || Pan-STARRS || H || align=right data-sort-value="0.68" | 680 m || 
|-id=747 bgcolor=#fefefe
| 537747 ||  || — || September 13, 2005 || Kitt Peak || Spacewatch ||  || align=right data-sort-value="0.55" | 550 m || 
|-id=748 bgcolor=#fefefe
| 537748 ||  || — || October 17, 2007 || Catalina || CSS || H || align=right data-sort-value="0.65" | 650 m || 
|-id=749 bgcolor=#FA8072
| 537749 ||  || — || June 12, 2012 || Haleakala || Pan-STARRS || H || align=right data-sort-value="0.80" | 800 m || 
|-id=750 bgcolor=#d6d6d6
| 537750 ||  || — || October 7, 2004 || Kitt Peak || Spacewatch ||  || align=right | 3.9 km || 
|-id=751 bgcolor=#fefefe
| 537751 ||  || — || May 31, 2009 || Mount Lemmon || Mount Lemmon Survey || H || align=right data-sort-value="0.68" | 680 m || 
|-id=752 bgcolor=#fefefe
| 537752 ||  || — || September 10, 2007 || Mount Lemmon || Mount Lemmon Survey || H || align=right data-sort-value="0.59" | 590 m || 
|-id=753 bgcolor=#fefefe
| 537753 ||  || — || May 20, 2014 || Haleakala || Pan-STARRS || H || align=right data-sort-value="0.57" | 570 m || 
|-id=754 bgcolor=#fefefe
| 537754 ||  || — || May 28, 2006 || Kitt Peak || Spacewatch || H || align=right data-sort-value="0.68" | 680 m || 
|-id=755 bgcolor=#fefefe
| 537755 ||  || — || March 25, 2011 || Kitt Peak || Spacewatch || H || align=right data-sort-value="0.71" | 710 m || 
|-id=756 bgcolor=#fefefe
| 537756 ||  || — || October 22, 2015 || Haleakala || Pan-STARRS || H || align=right data-sort-value="0.55" | 550 m || 
|-id=757 bgcolor=#fefefe
| 537757 ||  || — || May 2, 2009 || Kitt Peak || Spacewatch || H || align=right data-sort-value="0.54" | 540 m || 
|-id=758 bgcolor=#fefefe
| 537758 ||  || — || November 7, 2007 || Kitt Peak || Spacewatch || H || align=right data-sort-value="0.69" | 690 m || 
|-id=759 bgcolor=#fefefe
| 537759 ||  || — || October 21, 2015 || Haleakala || Pan-STARRS || H || align=right data-sort-value="0.58" | 580 m || 
|-id=760 bgcolor=#E9E9E9
| 537760 ||  || — || June 30, 2013 || Haleakala || Pan-STARRS ||  || align=right | 1.4 km || 
|-id=761 bgcolor=#fefefe
| 537761 ||  || — || February 12, 2008 || Mount Lemmon || Mount Lemmon Survey || H || align=right data-sort-value="0.72" | 720 m || 
|-id=762 bgcolor=#FA8072
| 537762 ||  || — || September 12, 2007 || Siding Spring || SSS || H || align=right data-sort-value="0.66" | 660 m || 
|-id=763 bgcolor=#fefefe
| 537763 ||  || — || February 24, 2014 || Haleakala || Pan-STARRS || H || align=right data-sort-value="0.48" | 480 m || 
|-id=764 bgcolor=#fefefe
| 537764 ||  || — || September 11, 2010 || Mount Lemmon || Mount Lemmon Survey || H || align=right data-sort-value="0.83" | 830 m || 
|-id=765 bgcolor=#fefefe
| 537765 ||  || — || May 21, 2014 || Haleakala || Pan-STARRS ||  || align=right data-sort-value="0.60" | 600 m || 
|-id=766 bgcolor=#fefefe
| 537766 ||  || — || March 14, 2004 || Kitt Peak || Spacewatch ||  || align=right | 1.4 km || 
|-id=767 bgcolor=#fefefe
| 537767 ||  || — || October 7, 2004 || Kitt Peak || Spacewatch ||  || align=right data-sort-value="0.65" | 650 m || 
|-id=768 bgcolor=#fefefe
| 537768 ||  || — || October 8, 2015 || Mount Lemmon || Mount Lemmon Survey ||  || align=right data-sort-value="0.71" | 710 m || 
|-id=769 bgcolor=#fefefe
| 537769 ||  || — || January 22, 2006 || Catalina || CSS || H || align=right data-sort-value="0.71" | 710 m || 
|-id=770 bgcolor=#d6d6d6
| 537770 ||  || — || May 27, 2014 || Haleakala || Pan-STARRS ||  || align=right | 3.2 km || 
|-id=771 bgcolor=#fefefe
| 537771 ||  || — || July 16, 2004 || Socorro || LINEAR ||  || align=right data-sort-value="0.75" | 750 m || 
|-id=772 bgcolor=#fefefe
| 537772 ||  || — || January 11, 2011 || Kitt Peak || Spacewatch || H || align=right data-sort-value="0.58" | 580 m || 
|-id=773 bgcolor=#fefefe
| 537773 ||  || — || October 8, 2004 || Socorro || LINEAR || H || align=right data-sort-value="0.76" | 760 m || 
|-id=774 bgcolor=#FA8072
| 537774 ||  || — || October 3, 2015 || Catalina || CSS || H || align=right data-sort-value="0.68" | 680 m || 
|-id=775 bgcolor=#fefefe
| 537775 ||  || — || December 11, 2012 || Mount Lemmon || Mount Lemmon Survey ||  || align=right data-sort-value="0.59" | 590 m || 
|-id=776 bgcolor=#fefefe
| 537776 ||  || — || November 12, 1999 || Kitt Peak || Spacewatch ||  || align=right data-sort-value="0.62" | 620 m || 
|-id=777 bgcolor=#fefefe
| 537777 ||  || — || November 5, 2004 || Anderson Mesa || LONEOS || H || align=right data-sort-value="0.57" | 570 m || 
|-id=778 bgcolor=#FA8072
| 537778 ||  || — || October 29, 2010 || Kitt Peak || Spacewatch || H || align=right data-sort-value="0.49" | 490 m || 
|-id=779 bgcolor=#fefefe
| 537779 ||  || — || October 19, 2007 || Catalina || CSS || H || align=right data-sort-value="0.75" | 750 m || 
|-id=780 bgcolor=#fefefe
| 537780 ||  || — || October 18, 2015 || Haleakala || Pan-STARRS ||  || align=right data-sort-value="0.81" | 810 m || 
|-id=781 bgcolor=#fefefe
| 537781 ||  || — || September 19, 2015 || Haleakala || Pan-STARRS ||  || align=right | 1.8 km || 
|-id=782 bgcolor=#fefefe
| 537782 ||  || — || November 20, 2007 || Catalina || CSS || H || align=right data-sort-value="0.61" | 610 m || 
|-id=783 bgcolor=#FA8072
| 537783 ||  || — || December 5, 2002 || Socorro || LINEAR || H || align=right data-sort-value="0.73" | 730 m || 
|-id=784 bgcolor=#FA8072
| 537784 ||  || — || November 10, 2010 || Kitt Peak || Spacewatch || H || align=right data-sort-value="0.75" | 750 m || 
|-id=785 bgcolor=#fefefe
| 537785 ||  || — || November 2, 2007 || Kitt Peak || Spacewatch || H || align=right data-sort-value="0.68" | 680 m || 
|-id=786 bgcolor=#FA8072
| 537786 ||  || — || March 28, 2009 || Kitt Peak || Spacewatch || H || align=right data-sort-value="0.64" | 640 m || 
|-id=787 bgcolor=#fefefe
| 537787 ||  || — || October 3, 2015 || Catalina || CSS || H || align=right data-sort-value="0.64" | 640 m || 
|-id=788 bgcolor=#fefefe
| 537788 ||  || — || October 10, 2007 || Catalina || CSS ||  || align=right | 1.0 km || 
|-id=789 bgcolor=#fefefe
| 537789 ||  || — || September 19, 2015 || Haleakala || Pan-STARRS ||  || align=right data-sort-value="0.62" | 620 m || 
|-id=790 bgcolor=#d6d6d6
| 537790 ||  || — || August 16, 2009 || Kitt Peak || Spacewatch ||  || align=right | 3.2 km || 
|-id=791 bgcolor=#fefefe
| 537791 ||  || — || April 22, 2011 || Kitt Peak || Spacewatch ||  || align=right data-sort-value="0.64" | 640 m || 
|-id=792 bgcolor=#fefefe
| 537792 ||  || — || April 29, 2006 || Kitt Peak || Spacewatch || V || align=right data-sort-value="0.63" | 630 m || 
|-id=793 bgcolor=#FA8072
| 537793 ||  || — || August 23, 2004 || Siding Spring || SSS || H || align=right data-sort-value="0.62" | 620 m || 
|-id=794 bgcolor=#fefefe
| 537794 ||  || — || November 2, 2015 || Mount Lemmon || Mount Lemmon Survey || H || align=right data-sort-value="0.62" | 620 m || 
|-id=795 bgcolor=#fefefe
| 537795 ||  || — || November 18, 2015 || Haleakala || Pan-STARRS || H || align=right data-sort-value="0.58" | 580 m || 
|-id=796 bgcolor=#FA8072
| 537796 ||  || — || September 12, 2007 || Mount Lemmon || Mount Lemmon Survey ||  || align=right data-sort-value="0.39" | 390 m || 
|-id=797 bgcolor=#fefefe
| 537797 ||  || — || May 1, 2009 || Mount Lemmon || Mount Lemmon Survey || H || align=right data-sort-value="0.74" | 740 m || 
|-id=798 bgcolor=#fefefe
| 537798 ||  || — || April 30, 2014 || Haleakala || Pan-STARRS || H || align=right data-sort-value="0.54" | 540 m || 
|-id=799 bgcolor=#fefefe
| 537799 ||  || — || February 13, 2010 || Mount Lemmon || Mount Lemmon Survey ||  || align=right data-sort-value="0.62" | 620 m || 
|-id=800 bgcolor=#fefefe
| 537800 ||  || — || March 10, 2014 || Mount Lemmon || Mount Lemmon Survey || H || align=right data-sort-value="0.65" | 650 m || 
|}

537801–537900 

|-bgcolor=#E9E9E9
| 537801 ||  || — || September 17, 2014 || Haleakala || Pan-STARRS ||  || align=right | 1.6 km || 
|-id=802 bgcolor=#E9E9E9
| 537802 ||  || — || October 14, 2014 || Mount Lemmon || Mount Lemmon Survey ||  || align=right | 1.5 km || 
|-id=803 bgcolor=#E9E9E9
| 537803 ||  || — || September 20, 2014 || Catalina || CSS ||  || align=right | 2.4 km || 
|-id=804 bgcolor=#fefefe
| 537804 ||  || — || December 3, 2015 || Haleakala || Pan-STARRS || H || align=right data-sort-value="0.54" | 540 m || 
|-id=805 bgcolor=#E9E9E9
| 537805 ||  || — || October 19, 2006 || Kitt Peak || Spacewatch ||  || align=right | 1.2 km || 
|-id=806 bgcolor=#fefefe
| 537806 ||  || — || January 2, 2013 || Mount Lemmon || Mount Lemmon Survey ||  || align=right data-sort-value="0.62" | 620 m || 
|-id=807 bgcolor=#fefefe
| 537807 ||  || — || September 7, 1999 || Socorro || LINEAR ||  || align=right data-sort-value="0.57" | 570 m || 
|-id=808 bgcolor=#fefefe
| 537808 ||  || — || September 12, 2015 || Haleakala || Pan-STARRS || H || align=right data-sort-value="0.59" | 590 m || 
|-id=809 bgcolor=#fefefe
| 537809 ||  || — || September 23, 2008 || Mount Lemmon || Mount Lemmon Survey ||  || align=right data-sort-value="0.63" | 630 m || 
|-id=810 bgcolor=#fefefe
| 537810 ||  || — || October 3, 2008 || Kitt Peak || Spacewatch ||  || align=right data-sort-value="0.48" | 480 m || 
|-id=811 bgcolor=#d6d6d6
| 537811 ||  || — || November 5, 2007 || Mount Lemmon || Mount Lemmon Survey || 3:2 || align=right | 4.0 km || 
|-id=812 bgcolor=#fefefe
| 537812 ||  || — || May 26, 2011 || Mount Lemmon || Mount Lemmon Survey ||  || align=right data-sort-value="0.58" | 580 m || 
|-id=813 bgcolor=#fefefe
| 537813 ||  || — || April 7, 2003 || Kitt Peak || Spacewatch ||  || align=right data-sort-value="0.88" | 880 m || 
|-id=814 bgcolor=#E9E9E9
| 537814 ||  || — || July 10, 2010 || WISE || WISE ||  || align=right | 1.8 km || 
|-id=815 bgcolor=#fefefe
| 537815 ||  || — || February 19, 2007 || Mount Lemmon || Mount Lemmon Survey ||  || align=right data-sort-value="0.58" | 580 m || 
|-id=816 bgcolor=#fefefe
| 537816 ||  || — || May 8, 2014 || Haleakala || Pan-STARRS ||  || align=right data-sort-value="0.55" | 550 m || 
|-id=817 bgcolor=#fefefe
| 537817 ||  || — || October 17, 2007 || Mount Lemmon || Mount Lemmon Survey ||  || align=right data-sort-value="0.88" | 880 m || 
|-id=818 bgcolor=#E9E9E9
| 537818 ||  || — || October 13, 2010 || Catalina || CSS ||  || align=right | 1.3 km || 
|-id=819 bgcolor=#fefefe
| 537819 ||  || — || April 5, 2014 || Haleakala || Pan-STARRS ||  || align=right data-sort-value="0.69" | 690 m || 
|-id=820 bgcolor=#fefefe
| 537820 ||  || — || May 19, 2004 || Kitt Peak || Spacewatch ||  || align=right data-sort-value="0.64" | 640 m || 
|-id=821 bgcolor=#fefefe
| 537821 ||  || — || October 1, 2008 || Mount Lemmon || Mount Lemmon Survey ||  || align=right data-sort-value="0.58" | 580 m || 
|-id=822 bgcolor=#fefefe
| 537822 ||  || — || February 3, 2013 || Haleakala || Pan-STARRS ||  || align=right data-sort-value="0.67" | 670 m || 
|-id=823 bgcolor=#fefefe
| 537823 ||  || — || April 11, 2003 || Kitt Peak || Spacewatch ||  || align=right data-sort-value="0.82" | 820 m || 
|-id=824 bgcolor=#fefefe
| 537824 ||  || — || November 18, 2008 || Kitt Peak || Spacewatch ||  || align=right data-sort-value="0.78" | 780 m || 
|-id=825 bgcolor=#fefefe
| 537825 ||  || — || January 1, 2009 || Kitt Peak || Spacewatch ||  || align=right data-sort-value="0.90" | 900 m || 
|-id=826 bgcolor=#fefefe
| 537826 ||  || — || November 21, 2008 || Kitt Peak || Spacewatch ||  || align=right data-sort-value="0.77" | 770 m || 
|-id=827 bgcolor=#fefefe
| 537827 ||  || — || December 22, 2008 || Mount Lemmon || Mount Lemmon Survey ||  || align=right data-sort-value="0.90" | 900 m || 
|-id=828 bgcolor=#E9E9E9
| 537828 ||  || — || July 26, 2010 || WISE || WISE ||  || align=right | 2.1 km || 
|-id=829 bgcolor=#FFC2E0
| 537829 ||  || — || December 12, 2015 || WISE || WISE || ATE || align=right data-sort-value="0.31" | 310 m || 
|-id=830 bgcolor=#fefefe
| 537830 ||  || — || November 30, 2008 || Kitt Peak || Spacewatch ||  || align=right data-sort-value="0.83" | 830 m || 
|-id=831 bgcolor=#fefefe
| 537831 ||  || — || January 18, 2013 || Kitt Peak || Spacewatch ||  || align=right data-sort-value="0.86" | 860 m || 
|-id=832 bgcolor=#fefefe
| 537832 ||  || — || December 16, 2007 || Mount Lemmon || Mount Lemmon Survey || H || align=right data-sort-value="0.67" | 670 m || 
|-id=833 bgcolor=#fefefe
| 537833 ||  || — || February 13, 2008 || Mount Lemmon || Mount Lemmon Survey || H || align=right data-sort-value="0.68" | 680 m || 
|-id=834 bgcolor=#fefefe
| 537834 ||  || — || January 10, 2014 || Haleakala || Pan-STARRS || H || align=right data-sort-value="0.59" | 590 m || 
|-id=835 bgcolor=#fefefe
| 537835 ||  || — || April 15, 2011 || Haleakala || Pan-STARRS || H || align=right data-sort-value="0.72" | 720 m || 
|-id=836 bgcolor=#fefefe
| 537836 ||  || — || December 29, 2012 || Haleakala || Pan-STARRS || H || align=right data-sort-value="0.58" | 580 m || 
|-id=837 bgcolor=#d6d6d6
| 537837 ||  || — || September 13, 2007 || Kitt Peak || Spacewatch ||  || align=right | 2.9 km || 
|-id=838 bgcolor=#fefefe
| 537838 ||  || — || April 20, 2007 || Kitt Peak || Spacewatch ||  || align=right data-sort-value="0.52" | 520 m || 
|-id=839 bgcolor=#d6d6d6
| 537839 ||  || — || November 24, 2014 || Mount Lemmon || Mount Lemmon Survey ||  || align=right | 3.0 km || 
|-id=840 bgcolor=#E9E9E9
| 537840 ||  || — || November 27, 2014 || Haleakala || Pan-STARRS ||  || align=right | 1.0 km || 
|-id=841 bgcolor=#E9E9E9
| 537841 ||  || — || October 2, 2006 || Mount Lemmon || Mount Lemmon Survey ||  || align=right data-sort-value="0.89" | 890 m || 
|-id=842 bgcolor=#E9E9E9
| 537842 ||  || — || December 16, 2006 || Mount Lemmon || Mount Lemmon Survey ||  || align=right | 1.6 km || 
|-id=843 bgcolor=#E9E9E9
| 537843 ||  || — || November 2, 2010 || Mount Lemmon || Mount Lemmon Survey ||  || align=right | 1.1 km || 
|-id=844 bgcolor=#E9E9E9
| 537844 ||  || — || October 23, 2006 || Mount Lemmon || Mount Lemmon Survey ||  || align=right | 2.2 km || 
|-id=845 bgcolor=#E9E9E9
| 537845 ||  || — || December 13, 2015 || Haleakala || Pan-STARRS ||  || align=right data-sort-value="0.97" | 970 m || 
|-id=846 bgcolor=#fefefe
| 537846 ||  || — || October 25, 2011 || Haleakala || Pan-STARRS ||  || align=right data-sort-value="0.85" | 850 m || 
|-id=847 bgcolor=#fefefe
| 537847 ||  || — || May 12, 2013 || Mount Lemmon || Mount Lemmon Survey ||  || align=right data-sort-value="0.63" | 630 m || 
|-id=848 bgcolor=#fefefe
| 537848 ||  || — || February 22, 2009 || Kitt Peak || Spacewatch ||  || align=right data-sort-value="0.93" | 930 m || 
|-id=849 bgcolor=#fefefe
| 537849 ||  || — || April 15, 2013 || Haleakala || Pan-STARRS ||  || align=right data-sort-value="0.75" | 750 m || 
|-id=850 bgcolor=#E9E9E9
| 537850 ||  || — || October 1, 2008 || Mount Lemmon || Mount Lemmon Survey ||  || align=right | 2.9 km || 
|-id=851 bgcolor=#E9E9E9
| 537851 ||  || — || November 22, 2014 || Haleakala || Pan-STARRS ||  || align=right | 1.8 km || 
|-id=852 bgcolor=#d6d6d6
| 537852 ||  || — || October 23, 2009 || Mount Lemmon || Mount Lemmon Survey ||  || align=right | 2.5 km || 
|-id=853 bgcolor=#E9E9E9
| 537853 ||  || — || August 13, 2013 || Haleakala || Pan-STARRS ||  || align=right | 2.1 km || 
|-id=854 bgcolor=#E9E9E9
| 537854 ||  || — || April 15, 2012 || Haleakala || Pan-STARRS ||  || align=right | 2.3 km || 
|-id=855 bgcolor=#d6d6d6
| 537855 ||  || — || May 21, 2012 || Haleakala || Pan-STARRS ||  || align=right | 2.5 km || 
|-id=856 bgcolor=#E9E9E9
| 537856 ||  || — || March 16, 2012 || Haleakala || Pan-STARRS ||  || align=right data-sort-value="0.85" | 850 m || 
|-id=857 bgcolor=#d6d6d6
| 537857 ||  || — || October 1, 2003 || Kitt Peak || Spacewatch ||  || align=right | 3.0 km || 
|-id=858 bgcolor=#fefefe
| 537858 ||  || — || March 31, 2009 || Kitt Peak || Spacewatch ||  || align=right data-sort-value="0.77" | 770 m || 
|-id=859 bgcolor=#E9E9E9
| 537859 ||  || — || October 12, 2010 || Mount Lemmon || Mount Lemmon Survey ||  || align=right | 1.2 km || 
|-id=860 bgcolor=#E9E9E9
| 537860 ||  || — || September 25, 2014 || Mount Lemmon || Mount Lemmon Survey ||  || align=right | 1.0 km || 
|-id=861 bgcolor=#E9E9E9
| 537861 ||  || — || February 19, 2012 || Kitt Peak || Spacewatch ||  || align=right | 2.2 km || 
|-id=862 bgcolor=#E9E9E9
| 537862 ||  || — || February 12, 2012 || Catalina || CSS ||  || align=right | 1.2 km || 
|-id=863 bgcolor=#d6d6d6
| 537863 ||  || — || November 17, 2014 || Haleakala || Pan-STARRS ||  || align=right | 3.0 km || 
|-id=864 bgcolor=#E9E9E9
| 537864 ||  || — || October 28, 2014 || Mount Lemmon || Mount Lemmon Survey ||  || align=right | 2.0 km || 
|-id=865 bgcolor=#E9E9E9
| 537865 ||  || — || October 3, 2006 || Kitt Peak || Spacewatch ||  || align=right data-sort-value="0.73" | 730 m || 
|-id=866 bgcolor=#E9E9E9
| 537866 ||  || — || November 20, 2014 || Mount Lemmon || Mount Lemmon Survey ||  || align=right | 2.3 km || 
|-id=867 bgcolor=#E9E9E9
| 537867 ||  || — || December 14, 2006 || Kitt Peak || Spacewatch ||  || align=right | 1.4 km || 
|-id=868 bgcolor=#E9E9E9
| 537868 ||  || — || January 9, 2011 || Mount Lemmon || Mount Lemmon Survey ||  || align=right | 2.7 km || 
|-id=869 bgcolor=#E9E9E9
| 537869 ||  || — || February 27, 2012 || Haleakala || Pan-STARRS ||  || align=right | 1.1 km || 
|-id=870 bgcolor=#E9E9E9
| 537870 ||  || — || October 26, 2014 || Catalina || CSS ||  || align=right | 1.4 km || 
|-id=871 bgcolor=#fefefe
| 537871 ||  || — || December 22, 2008 || Kitt Peak || Spacewatch ||  || align=right data-sort-value="0.79" | 790 m || 
|-id=872 bgcolor=#fefefe
| 537872 ||  || — || October 10, 2008 || Mount Lemmon || Mount Lemmon Survey ||  || align=right data-sort-value="0.61" | 610 m || 
|-id=873 bgcolor=#E9E9E9
| 537873 ||  || — || March 13, 2012 || Haleakala || Pan-STARRS ||  || align=right | 1.3 km || 
|-id=874 bgcolor=#d6d6d6
| 537874 ||  || — || August 27, 2013 || Haleakala || Pan-STARRS ||  || align=right | 2.6 km || 
|-id=875 bgcolor=#E9E9E9
| 537875 ||  || — || December 13, 2010 || Mount Lemmon || Mount Lemmon Survey ||  || align=right | 2.0 km || 
|-id=876 bgcolor=#E9E9E9
| 537876 ||  || — || July 5, 2014 || Haleakala || Pan-STARRS ||  || align=right | 1.7 km || 
|-id=877 bgcolor=#d6d6d6
| 537877 ||  || — || September 10, 2013 || Haleakala || Pan-STARRS ||  || align=right | 2.6 km || 
|-id=878 bgcolor=#E9E9E9
| 537878 ||  || — || November 18, 2011 || Mount Lemmon || Mount Lemmon Survey ||  || align=right | 1.3 km || 
|-id=879 bgcolor=#fefefe
| 537879 ||  || — || December 8, 2015 || Haleakala || Pan-STARRS || H || align=right data-sort-value="0.79" | 790 m || 
|-id=880 bgcolor=#fefefe
| 537880 ||  || — || December 9, 2001 || Socorro || LINEAR ||  || align=right | 1.5 km || 
|-id=881 bgcolor=#fefefe
| 537881 ||  || — || November 4, 2007 || Catalina || CSS || H || align=right data-sort-value="0.70" | 700 m || 
|-id=882 bgcolor=#fefefe
| 537882 ||  || — || April 21, 2009 || Mount Lemmon || Mount Lemmon Survey ||  || align=right data-sort-value="0.81" | 810 m || 
|-id=883 bgcolor=#fefefe
| 537883 ||  || — || November 6, 2015 || Mount Lemmon || Mount Lemmon Survey ||  || align=right data-sort-value="0.82" | 820 m || 
|-id=884 bgcolor=#fefefe
| 537884 ||  || — || February 29, 2008 || XuYi || PMO NEO || H || align=right data-sort-value="0.59" | 590 m || 
|-id=885 bgcolor=#E9E9E9
| 537885 ||  || — || December 18, 2015 || Mount Lemmon || Mount Lemmon Survey ||  || align=right | 1.8 km || 
|-id=886 bgcolor=#fefefe
| 537886 ||  || — || August 28, 2014 || Haleakala || Pan-STARRS ||  || align=right data-sort-value="0.83" | 830 m || 
|-id=887 bgcolor=#E9E9E9
| 537887 ||  || — || December 30, 2011 || Kitt Peak || Spacewatch ||  || align=right data-sort-value="0.72" | 720 m || 
|-id=888 bgcolor=#fefefe
| 537888 ||  || — || November 20, 2008 || Kitt Peak || Spacewatch ||  || align=right data-sort-value="0.70" | 700 m || 
|-id=889 bgcolor=#fefefe
| 537889 ||  || — || December 22, 2008 || Kitt Peak || Spacewatch ||  || align=right data-sort-value="0.55" | 550 m || 
|-id=890 bgcolor=#E9E9E9
| 537890 ||  || — || October 24, 2011 || Mount Lemmon || Mount Lemmon Survey ||  || align=right | 1.5 km || 
|-id=891 bgcolor=#d6d6d6
| 537891 ||  || — || September 15, 2004 || Kitt Peak || Spacewatch ||  || align=right | 2.6 km || 
|-id=892 bgcolor=#fefefe
| 537892 ||  || — || November 20, 2008 || Mount Lemmon || Mount Lemmon Survey ||  || align=right data-sort-value="0.65" | 650 m || 
|-id=893 bgcolor=#fefefe
| 537893 ||  || — || December 3, 2015 || Haleakala || Pan-STARRS || H || align=right data-sort-value="0.65" | 650 m || 
|-id=894 bgcolor=#E9E9E9
| 537894 ||  || — || February 24, 2012 || Haleakala || Pan-STARRS ||  || align=right | 2.6 km || 
|-id=895 bgcolor=#fefefe
| 537895 ||  || — || October 25, 2011 || Haleakala || Pan-STARRS ||  || align=right data-sort-value="0.81" | 810 m || 
|-id=896 bgcolor=#E9E9E9
| 537896 ||  || — || August 17, 2009 || Kitt Peak || Spacewatch ||  || align=right | 2.2 km || 
|-id=897 bgcolor=#fefefe
| 537897 ||  || — || October 25, 2008 || Mount Lemmon || Mount Lemmon Survey ||  || align=right data-sort-value="0.48" | 480 m || 
|-id=898 bgcolor=#E9E9E9
| 537898 ||  || — || October 17, 2010 || Mount Lemmon || Mount Lemmon Survey ||  || align=right data-sort-value="0.94" | 940 m || 
|-id=899 bgcolor=#E9E9E9
| 537899 ||  || — || November 25, 2006 || Mount Lemmon || Mount Lemmon Survey ||  || align=right | 1.8 km || 
|-id=900 bgcolor=#E9E9E9
| 537900 ||  || — || October 22, 2005 || Kitt Peak || Spacewatch ||  || align=right | 2.9 km || 
|}

537901–538000 

|-bgcolor=#E9E9E9
| 537901 ||  || — || February 23, 2012 || Catalina || CSS ||  || align=right | 1.2 km || 
|-id=902 bgcolor=#fefefe
| 537902 ||  || — || March 23, 2006 || Kitt Peak || Spacewatch ||  || align=right data-sort-value="0.67" | 670 m || 
|-id=903 bgcolor=#fefefe
| 537903 ||  || — || December 13, 1999 || Kitt Peak || Spacewatch ||  || align=right data-sort-value="0.60" | 600 m || 
|-id=904 bgcolor=#fefefe
| 537904 ||  || — || January 11, 1999 || Kitt Peak || Spacewatch ||  || align=right data-sort-value="0.62" | 620 m || 
|-id=905 bgcolor=#E9E9E9
| 537905 ||  || — || October 30, 2005 || Kitt Peak || Spacewatch ||  || align=right | 2.6 km || 
|-id=906 bgcolor=#fefefe
| 537906 ||  || — || September 26, 2009 || Catalina || CSS || H || align=right data-sort-value="0.80" | 800 m || 
|-id=907 bgcolor=#fefefe
| 537907 ||  || — || December 22, 2008 || Mount Lemmon || Mount Lemmon Survey ||  || align=right data-sort-value="0.72" | 720 m || 
|-id=908 bgcolor=#E9E9E9
| 537908 ||  || — || December 16, 2006 || Mount Lemmon || Mount Lemmon Survey ||  || align=right | 2.0 km || 
|-id=909 bgcolor=#fefefe
| 537909 ||  || — || February 8, 2008 || Mount Lemmon || Mount Lemmon Survey || H || align=right data-sort-value="0.40" | 400 m || 
|-id=910 bgcolor=#d6d6d6
| 537910 ||  || — || November 22, 2000 || Kitt Peak || Spacewatch ||  || align=right | 3.4 km || 
|-id=911 bgcolor=#E9E9E9
| 537911 ||  || — || November 5, 2010 || Mount Lemmon || Mount Lemmon Survey ||  || align=right | 1.2 km || 
|-id=912 bgcolor=#fefefe
| 537912 ||  || — || December 12, 2004 || Kitt Peak || Spacewatch ||  || align=right data-sort-value="0.91" | 910 m || 
|-id=913 bgcolor=#fefefe
| 537913 ||  || — || December 28, 2005 || Kitt Peak || Spacewatch ||  || align=right data-sort-value="0.58" | 580 m || 
|-id=914 bgcolor=#fefefe
| 537914 ||  || — || January 23, 2006 || Kitt Peak || Spacewatch ||  || align=right data-sort-value="0.51" | 510 m || 
|-id=915 bgcolor=#fefefe
| 537915 ||  || — || October 11, 2007 || Kitt Peak || Spacewatch ||  || align=right data-sort-value="0.67" | 670 m || 
|-id=916 bgcolor=#E9E9E9
| 537916 ||  || — || November 21, 2005 || Kitt Peak || Spacewatch ||  || align=right | 2.4 km || 
|-id=917 bgcolor=#E9E9E9
| 537917 ||  || — || February 21, 2007 || Mount Lemmon || Mount Lemmon Survey ||  || align=right | 2.2 km || 
|-id=918 bgcolor=#fefefe
| 537918 ||  || — || December 2, 2008 || Mount Lemmon || Mount Lemmon Survey ||  || align=right data-sort-value="0.45" | 450 m || 
|-id=919 bgcolor=#fefefe
| 537919 ||  || — || January 7, 2016 || Haleakala || Pan-STARRS ||  || align=right data-sort-value="0.60" | 600 m || 
|-id=920 bgcolor=#fefefe
| 537920 ||  || — || April 15, 2013 || Haleakala || Pan-STARRS || V || align=right data-sort-value="0.54" | 540 m || 
|-id=921 bgcolor=#fefefe
| 537921 ||  || — || December 24, 2005 || Kitt Peak || Spacewatch ||  || align=right data-sort-value="0.45" | 450 m || 
|-id=922 bgcolor=#fefefe
| 537922 ||  || — || October 10, 2007 || Catalina || CSS ||  || align=right data-sort-value="0.72" | 720 m || 
|-id=923 bgcolor=#fefefe
| 537923 ||  || — || February 20, 2009 || Kitt Peak || Spacewatch || V || align=right data-sort-value="0.54" | 540 m || 
|-id=924 bgcolor=#d6d6d6
| 537924 ||  || — || January 29, 2011 || Mount Lemmon || Mount Lemmon Survey ||  || align=right | 2.6 km || 
|-id=925 bgcolor=#fefefe
| 537925 ||  || — || October 20, 2011 || Mount Lemmon || Mount Lemmon Survey ||  || align=right data-sort-value="0.77" | 770 m || 
|-id=926 bgcolor=#fefefe
| 537926 ||  || — || February 28, 2009 || Kitt Peak || Spacewatch ||  || align=right data-sort-value="0.69" | 690 m || 
|-id=927 bgcolor=#E9E9E9
| 537927 ||  || — || February 9, 2008 || Kitt Peak || Spacewatch ||  || align=right data-sort-value="0.95" | 950 m || 
|-id=928 bgcolor=#E9E9E9
| 537928 ||  || — || June 27, 2004 || Kitt Peak || Spacewatch ||  || align=right | 1.5 km || 
|-id=929 bgcolor=#E9E9E9
| 537929 ||  || — || March 24, 2003 || Kitt Peak || Spacewatch || MRX || align=right | 1.3 km || 
|-id=930 bgcolor=#fefefe
| 537930 ||  || — || October 9, 2007 || Mount Lemmon || Mount Lemmon Survey ||  || align=right data-sort-value="0.70" | 700 m || 
|-id=931 bgcolor=#E9E9E9
| 537931 ||  || — || July 14, 2013 || Haleakala || Pan-STARRS ||  || align=right | 1.9 km || 
|-id=932 bgcolor=#E9E9E9
| 537932 ||  || — || February 9, 2008 || Mount Lemmon || Mount Lemmon Survey ||  || align=right | 1.0 km || 
|-id=933 bgcolor=#fefefe
| 537933 ||  || — || October 15, 2007 || Catalina || CSS || V || align=right data-sort-value="0.73" | 730 m || 
|-id=934 bgcolor=#E9E9E9
| 537934 ||  || — || February 3, 2012 || Haleakala || Pan-STARRS ||  || align=right data-sort-value="0.80" | 800 m || 
|-id=935 bgcolor=#fefefe
| 537935 ||  || — || April 13, 2013 || Haleakala || Pan-STARRS ||  || align=right data-sort-value="0.53" | 530 m || 
|-id=936 bgcolor=#d6d6d6
| 537936 ||  || — || April 24, 2007 || Kitt Peak || Spacewatch ||  || align=right | 2.6 km || 
|-id=937 bgcolor=#fefefe
| 537937 ||  || — || April 5, 2014 || Haleakala || Pan-STARRS || H || align=right data-sort-value="0.46" | 460 m || 
|-id=938 bgcolor=#E9E9E9
| 537938 ||  || — || April 12, 2004 || Siding Spring || SSS ||  || align=right | 2.0 km || 
|-id=939 bgcolor=#E9E9E9
| 537939 ||  || — || December 12, 2010 || Kitt Peak || Spacewatch ||  || align=right | 1.8 km || 
|-id=940 bgcolor=#E9E9E9
| 537940 ||  || — || October 30, 2014 || Mount Lemmon || Mount Lemmon Survey ||  || align=right | 1.2 km || 
|-id=941 bgcolor=#fefefe
| 537941 ||  || — || January 11, 2008 || Kitt Peak || Spacewatch ||  || align=right | 1.1 km || 
|-id=942 bgcolor=#E9E9E9
| 537942 ||  || — || July 16, 2013 || Haleakala || Pan-STARRS ||  || align=right | 1.7 km || 
|-id=943 bgcolor=#fefefe
| 537943 ||  || — || September 26, 2011 || Haleakala || Pan-STARRS ||  || align=right data-sort-value="0.62" | 620 m || 
|-id=944 bgcolor=#fefefe
| 537944 ||  || — || October 29, 2005 || Catalina || CSS ||  || align=right data-sort-value="0.57" | 570 m || 
|-id=945 bgcolor=#E9E9E9
| 537945 ||  || — || July 19, 2013 || Haleakala || Pan-STARRS || EUN || align=right data-sort-value="0.96" | 960 m || 
|-id=946 bgcolor=#E9E9E9
| 537946 ||  || — || March 22, 2012 || Mount Lemmon || Mount Lemmon Survey ||  || align=right | 1.7 km || 
|-id=947 bgcolor=#E9E9E9
| 537947 ||  || — || August 15, 2009 || Catalina || CSS ||  || align=right | 1.7 km || 
|-id=948 bgcolor=#E9E9E9
| 537948 ||  || — || November 23, 2014 || Mount Lemmon || Mount Lemmon Survey || EUN || align=right | 1.3 km || 
|-id=949 bgcolor=#E9E9E9
| 537949 ||  || — || October 11, 2010 || Kitt Peak || Spacewatch ||  || align=right | 2.9 km || 
|-id=950 bgcolor=#FA8072
| 537950 ||  || — || December 13, 2004 || Campo Imperatore || CINEOS ||  || align=right data-sort-value="0.82" | 820 m || 
|-id=951 bgcolor=#E9E9E9
| 537951 ||  || — || November 15, 2006 || Mount Lemmon || Mount Lemmon Survey ||  || align=right | 2.0 km || 
|-id=952 bgcolor=#E9E9E9
| 537952 ||  || — || January 8, 2016 || Haleakala || Pan-STARRS ||  || align=right | 1.3 km || 
|-id=953 bgcolor=#E9E9E9
| 537953 ||  || — || January 8, 2016 || Haleakala || Pan-STARRS ||  || align=right data-sort-value="0.91" | 910 m || 
|-id=954 bgcolor=#E9E9E9
| 537954 ||  || — || August 30, 2005 || Kitt Peak || Spacewatch ||  || align=right | 1.0 km || 
|-id=955 bgcolor=#fefefe
| 537955 ||  || — || January 15, 2005 || Kitt Peak || Spacewatch || NYS || align=right data-sort-value="0.58" | 580 m || 
|-id=956 bgcolor=#fefefe
| 537956 ||  || — || September 23, 2011 || Haleakala || Pan-STARRS ||  || align=right data-sort-value="0.64" | 640 m || 
|-id=957 bgcolor=#fefefe
| 537957 ||  || — || January 19, 2008 || Mount Lemmon || Mount Lemmon Survey || H || align=right data-sort-value="0.54" | 540 m || 
|-id=958 bgcolor=#d6d6d6
| 537958 ||  || — || October 14, 2009 || Mount Lemmon || Mount Lemmon Survey ||  || align=right | 3.4 km || 
|-id=959 bgcolor=#fefefe
| 537959 ||  || — || June 8, 2014 || Haleakala || Pan-STARRS || H || align=right data-sort-value="0.67" | 670 m || 
|-id=960 bgcolor=#fefefe
| 537960 ||  || — || January 7, 2016 || Haleakala || Pan-STARRS || H || align=right data-sort-value="0.65" | 650 m || 
|-id=961 bgcolor=#fefefe
| 537961 ||  || — || May 28, 2011 || Kitt Peak || Spacewatch || H || align=right data-sort-value="0.62" | 620 m || 
|-id=962 bgcolor=#FA8072
| 537962 ||  || — || September 6, 2012 || Haleakala || Pan-STARRS || H || align=right data-sort-value="0.54" | 540 m || 
|-id=963 bgcolor=#fefefe
| 537963 ||  || — || January 19, 2008 || Mount Lemmon || Mount Lemmon Survey || H || align=right data-sort-value="0.64" | 640 m || 
|-id=964 bgcolor=#d6d6d6
| 537964 ||  || — || August 12, 2007 || XuYi || PMO NEO ||  || align=right | 2.7 km || 
|-id=965 bgcolor=#d6d6d6
| 537965 ||  || — || November 26, 2014 || Haleakala || Pan-STARRS ||  || align=right | 2.3 km || 
|-id=966 bgcolor=#fefefe
| 537966 ||  || — || April 4, 2005 || Catalina || CSS ||  || align=right data-sort-value="0.88" | 880 m || 
|-id=967 bgcolor=#fefefe
| 537967 ||  || — || December 19, 2004 || Mount Lemmon || Mount Lemmon Survey ||  || align=right data-sort-value="0.69" | 690 m || 
|-id=968 bgcolor=#d6d6d6
| 537968 ||  || — || December 18, 2004 || Kitt Peak || Spacewatch ||  || align=right | 3.4 km || 
|-id=969 bgcolor=#E9E9E9
| 537969 ||  || — || May 15, 2012 || Haleakala || Pan-STARRS ||  || align=right | 3.1 km || 
|-id=970 bgcolor=#fefefe
| 537970 ||  || — || November 17, 2014 || Haleakala || Pan-STARRS ||  || align=right data-sort-value="0.85" | 850 m || 
|-id=971 bgcolor=#fefefe
| 537971 ||  || — || May 12, 2013 || Mount Lemmon || Mount Lemmon Survey ||  || align=right data-sort-value="0.64" | 640 m || 
|-id=972 bgcolor=#fefefe
| 537972 ||  || — || January 2, 2012 || Mount Lemmon || Mount Lemmon Survey ||  || align=right data-sort-value="0.71" | 710 m || 
|-id=973 bgcolor=#E9E9E9
| 537973 ||  || — || September 23, 2014 || Mount Lemmon || Mount Lemmon Survey ||  || align=right data-sort-value="0.75" | 750 m || 
|-id=974 bgcolor=#fefefe
| 537974 ||  || — || October 12, 2007 || Mount Lemmon || Mount Lemmon Survey ||  || align=right data-sort-value="0.74" | 740 m || 
|-id=975 bgcolor=#fefefe
| 537975 ||  || — || July 25, 2014 || Haleakala || Pan-STARRS ||  || align=right data-sort-value="0.46" | 460 m || 
|-id=976 bgcolor=#E9E9E9
| 537976 ||  || — || September 12, 2004 || Kitt Peak || Spacewatch ||  || align=right | 2.4 km || 
|-id=977 bgcolor=#E9E9E9
| 537977 ||  || — || December 27, 2006 || Mount Lemmon || Mount Lemmon Survey ||  || align=right | 2.1 km || 
|-id=978 bgcolor=#E9E9E9
| 537978 ||  || — || March 20, 2012 || Haleakala || Pan-STARRS ||  || align=right | 1.4 km || 
|-id=979 bgcolor=#E9E9E9
| 537979 ||  || — || November 27, 2006 || Mount Lemmon || Mount Lemmon Survey ||  || align=right | 2.2 km || 
|-id=980 bgcolor=#E9E9E9
| 537980 ||  || — || September 30, 2006 || Mount Lemmon || Mount Lemmon Survey ||  || align=right data-sort-value="0.84" | 840 m || 
|-id=981 bgcolor=#E9E9E9
| 537981 ||  || — || October 26, 2014 || Mount Lemmon || Mount Lemmon Survey ||  || align=right | 1.6 km || 
|-id=982 bgcolor=#fefefe
| 537982 ||  || — || October 8, 2007 || Mount Lemmon || Mount Lemmon Survey ||  || align=right data-sort-value="0.78" | 780 m || 
|-id=983 bgcolor=#fefefe
| 537983 ||  || — || April 16, 2013 || Haleakala || Pan-STARRS ||  || align=right data-sort-value="0.70" | 700 m || 
|-id=984 bgcolor=#fefefe
| 537984 ||  || — || February 19, 2009 || Kitt Peak || Spacewatch ||  || align=right data-sort-value="0.79" | 790 m || 
|-id=985 bgcolor=#fefefe
| 537985 ||  || — || March 31, 2009 || Mount Lemmon || Mount Lemmon Survey ||  || align=right data-sort-value="0.76" | 760 m || 
|-id=986 bgcolor=#fefefe
| 537986 ||  || — || February 28, 2009 || Kitt Peak || Spacewatch ||  || align=right data-sort-value="0.70" | 700 m || 
|-id=987 bgcolor=#d6d6d6
| 537987 ||  || — || September 10, 2007 || Mount Lemmon || Mount Lemmon Survey ||  || align=right | 3.6 km || 
|-id=988 bgcolor=#E9E9E9
| 537988 ||  || — || January 9, 2016 || Haleakala || Pan-STARRS ||  || align=right | 2.1 km || 
|-id=989 bgcolor=#E9E9E9
| 537989 ||  || — || May 28, 2008 || Mount Lemmon || Mount Lemmon Survey ||  || align=right | 2.6 km || 
|-id=990 bgcolor=#d6d6d6
| 537990 ||  || — || March 13, 2011 || Mount Lemmon || Mount Lemmon Survey ||  || align=right | 3.5 km || 
|-id=991 bgcolor=#d6d6d6
| 537991 ||  || — || April 25, 2010 || WISE || WISE ||  || align=right | 3.5 km || 
|-id=992 bgcolor=#E9E9E9
| 537992 ||  || — || December 3, 2010 || Mount Lemmon || Mount Lemmon Survey ||  || align=right | 1.6 km || 
|-id=993 bgcolor=#E9E9E9
| 537993 ||  || — || January 1, 2012 || Mount Lemmon || Mount Lemmon Survey ||  || align=right | 1.2 km || 
|-id=994 bgcolor=#E9E9E9
| 537994 ||  || — || May 12, 2013 || Haleakala || Pan-STARRS ||  || align=right | 1.0 km || 
|-id=995 bgcolor=#E9E9E9
| 537995 ||  || — || February 25, 2012 || Mount Lemmon || Mount Lemmon Survey ||  || align=right | 1.1 km || 
|-id=996 bgcolor=#fefefe
| 537996 ||  || — || January 27, 2012 || Mount Lemmon || Mount Lemmon Survey ||  || align=right data-sort-value="0.64" | 640 m || 
|-id=997 bgcolor=#E9E9E9
| 537997 ||  || — || January 13, 2016 || Mount Lemmon || Mount Lemmon Survey ||  || align=right | 1.8 km || 
|-id=998 bgcolor=#E9E9E9
| 537998 ||  || — || October 12, 2014 || Mount Lemmon || Mount Lemmon Survey ||  || align=right data-sort-value="0.96" | 960 m || 
|-id=999 bgcolor=#d6d6d6
| 537999 ||  || — || January 4, 2016 || Haleakala || Pan-STARRS ||  || align=right | 3.1 km || 
|-id=000 bgcolor=#fefefe
| 538000 ||  || — || April 14, 2005 || Kitt Peak || Spacewatch ||  || align=right data-sort-value="0.99" | 990 m || 
|}

References

External links 
 Discovery Circumstances: Numbered Minor Planets (535001)–(540000) (IAU Minor Planet Center)

0537